

197001–197100 

|-bgcolor=#E9E9E9
| 197001 ||  || — || October 18, 2003 || Kitt Peak || Spacewatch || — || align=right | 4.0 km || 
|-id=002 bgcolor=#d6d6d6
| 197002 ||  || — || October 19, 2003 || Socorro || LINEAR || EMA || align=right | 6.7 km || 
|-id=003 bgcolor=#d6d6d6
| 197003 ||  || — || October 19, 2003 || Kitt Peak || Spacewatch || — || align=right | 4.4 km || 
|-id=004 bgcolor=#d6d6d6
| 197004 ||  || — || October 19, 2003 || Kitt Peak || Spacewatch || — || align=right | 4.2 km || 
|-id=005 bgcolor=#d6d6d6
| 197005 ||  || — || October 19, 2003 || Kitt Peak || Spacewatch || THM || align=right | 5.1 km || 
|-id=006 bgcolor=#d6d6d6
| 197006 ||  || — || October 19, 2003 || Kitt Peak || Spacewatch || KOR || align=right | 2.5 km || 
|-id=007 bgcolor=#d6d6d6
| 197007 ||  || — || October 19, 2003 || Kitt Peak || Spacewatch || — || align=right | 6.0 km || 
|-id=008 bgcolor=#d6d6d6
| 197008 ||  || — || October 19, 2003 || Haleakala || NEAT || — || align=right | 5.5 km || 
|-id=009 bgcolor=#d6d6d6
| 197009 ||  || — || October 20, 2003 || Palomar || NEAT || — || align=right | 5.2 km || 
|-id=010 bgcolor=#E9E9E9
| 197010 ||  || — || October 20, 2003 || Palomar || NEAT || AGN || align=right | 1.9 km || 
|-id=011 bgcolor=#d6d6d6
| 197011 ||  || — || October 20, 2003 || Palomar || NEAT || — || align=right | 4.4 km || 
|-id=012 bgcolor=#d6d6d6
| 197012 ||  || — || October 20, 2003 || Socorro || LINEAR || — || align=right | 4.5 km || 
|-id=013 bgcolor=#E9E9E9
| 197013 ||  || — || October 20, 2003 || Kitt Peak || Spacewatch || AGN || align=right | 2.0 km || 
|-id=014 bgcolor=#d6d6d6
| 197014 ||  || — || October 20, 2003 || Kitt Peak || Spacewatch || — || align=right | 3.6 km || 
|-id=015 bgcolor=#d6d6d6
| 197015 ||  || — || October 20, 2003 || Kitt Peak || Spacewatch || KOR || align=right | 2.7 km || 
|-id=016 bgcolor=#d6d6d6
| 197016 ||  || — || October 18, 2003 || Kitt Peak || Spacewatch || — || align=right | 4.0 km || 
|-id=017 bgcolor=#d6d6d6
| 197017 ||  || — || October 18, 2003 || Kitt Peak || Spacewatch || — || align=right | 3.1 km || 
|-id=018 bgcolor=#E9E9E9
| 197018 ||  || — || October 18, 2003 || Kitt Peak || Spacewatch || — || align=right | 2.4 km || 
|-id=019 bgcolor=#d6d6d6
| 197019 ||  || — || October 19, 2003 || Kitt Peak || Spacewatch || — || align=right | 2.9 km || 
|-id=020 bgcolor=#d6d6d6
| 197020 ||  || — || October 19, 2003 || Kitt Peak || Spacewatch || KOR || align=right | 2.0 km || 
|-id=021 bgcolor=#d6d6d6
| 197021 ||  || — || October 20, 2003 || Socorro || LINEAR || EOS || align=right | 3.4 km || 
|-id=022 bgcolor=#E9E9E9
| 197022 ||  || — || October 20, 2003 || Socorro || LINEAR || — || align=right | 1.7 km || 
|-id=023 bgcolor=#d6d6d6
| 197023 ||  || — || October 20, 2003 || Kitt Peak || Spacewatch || KOR || align=right | 2.1 km || 
|-id=024 bgcolor=#d6d6d6
| 197024 ||  || — || October 21, 2003 || Socorro || LINEAR || — || align=right | 4.0 km || 
|-id=025 bgcolor=#d6d6d6
| 197025 ||  || — || October 18, 2003 || Kitt Peak || Spacewatch || — || align=right | 2.4 km || 
|-id=026 bgcolor=#E9E9E9
| 197026 ||  || — || October 19, 2003 || Palomar || NEAT || ADE || align=right | 5.0 km || 
|-id=027 bgcolor=#E9E9E9
| 197027 ||  || — || October 20, 2003 || Palomar || NEAT || — || align=right | 1.9 km || 
|-id=028 bgcolor=#d6d6d6
| 197028 ||  || — || October 20, 2003 || Palomar || NEAT || — || align=right | 3.4 km || 
|-id=029 bgcolor=#E9E9E9
| 197029 ||  || — || October 20, 2003 || Kitt Peak || Spacewatch || — || align=right | 3.4 km || 
|-id=030 bgcolor=#d6d6d6
| 197030 ||  || — || October 20, 2003 || Palomar || NEAT || — || align=right | 3.6 km || 
|-id=031 bgcolor=#E9E9E9
| 197031 ||  || — || October 21, 2003 || Palomar || NEAT || WIT || align=right | 1.6 km || 
|-id=032 bgcolor=#d6d6d6
| 197032 ||  || — || October 18, 2003 || Palomar || NEAT || EOS || align=right | 3.6 km || 
|-id=033 bgcolor=#d6d6d6
| 197033 ||  || — || October 19, 2003 || Palomar || NEAT || — || align=right | 3.6 km || 
|-id=034 bgcolor=#d6d6d6
| 197034 ||  || — || October 19, 2003 || Palomar || NEAT || — || align=right | 5.7 km || 
|-id=035 bgcolor=#d6d6d6
| 197035 ||  || — || October 19, 2003 || Palomar || NEAT || — || align=right | 4.5 km || 
|-id=036 bgcolor=#d6d6d6
| 197036 ||  || — || October 19, 2003 || Palomar || NEAT || — || align=right | 6.0 km || 
|-id=037 bgcolor=#d6d6d6
| 197037 ||  || — || October 20, 2003 || Palomar || NEAT || URS || align=right | 6.2 km || 
|-id=038 bgcolor=#d6d6d6
| 197038 ||  || — || October 20, 2003 || Palomar || NEAT || — || align=right | 4.9 km || 
|-id=039 bgcolor=#d6d6d6
| 197039 ||  || — || October 20, 2003 || Palomar || NEAT || — || align=right | 6.2 km || 
|-id=040 bgcolor=#E9E9E9
| 197040 ||  || — || October 21, 2003 || Anderson Mesa || LONEOS || AGN || align=right | 1.6 km || 
|-id=041 bgcolor=#d6d6d6
| 197041 ||  || — || October 21, 2003 || Palomar || NEAT || — || align=right | 4.7 km || 
|-id=042 bgcolor=#d6d6d6
| 197042 ||  || — || October 21, 2003 || Palomar || NEAT || — || align=right | 5.5 km || 
|-id=043 bgcolor=#E9E9E9
| 197043 ||  || — || October 21, 2003 || Socorro || LINEAR || — || align=right | 3.7 km || 
|-id=044 bgcolor=#d6d6d6
| 197044 ||  || — || October 21, 2003 || Socorro || LINEAR || — || align=right | 5.2 km || 
|-id=045 bgcolor=#E9E9E9
| 197045 ||  || — || October 16, 2003 || Palomar || NEAT || — || align=right | 4.1 km || 
|-id=046 bgcolor=#d6d6d6
| 197046 ||  || — || October 16, 2003 || Anderson Mesa || LONEOS || EOS || align=right | 2.6 km || 
|-id=047 bgcolor=#E9E9E9
| 197047 ||  || — || October 16, 2003 || Anderson Mesa || LONEOS || — || align=right | 1.5 km || 
|-id=048 bgcolor=#E9E9E9
| 197048 ||  || — || October 16, 2003 || Anderson Mesa || LONEOS || — || align=right | 3.7 km || 
|-id=049 bgcolor=#d6d6d6
| 197049 ||  || — || October 18, 2003 || Anderson Mesa || LONEOS || — || align=right | 4.2 km || 
|-id=050 bgcolor=#d6d6d6
| 197050 ||  || — || October 18, 2003 || Anderson Mesa || LONEOS || — || align=right | 4.3 km || 
|-id=051 bgcolor=#d6d6d6
| 197051 ||  || — || October 18, 2003 || Anderson Mesa || LONEOS || EOS || align=right | 4.2 km || 
|-id=052 bgcolor=#d6d6d6
| 197052 ||  || — || October 18, 2003 || Anderson Mesa || LONEOS || — || align=right | 3.6 km || 
|-id=053 bgcolor=#d6d6d6
| 197053 ||  || — || October 18, 2003 || Anderson Mesa || LONEOS || — || align=right | 7.0 km || 
|-id=054 bgcolor=#d6d6d6
| 197054 ||  || — || October 20, 2003 || Socorro || LINEAR || — || align=right | 3.2 km || 
|-id=055 bgcolor=#d6d6d6
| 197055 ||  || — || October 20, 2003 || Socorro || LINEAR || HYG || align=right | 4.0 km || 
|-id=056 bgcolor=#d6d6d6
| 197056 ||  || — || October 20, 2003 || Socorro || LINEAR || — || align=right | 4.5 km || 
|-id=057 bgcolor=#d6d6d6
| 197057 ||  || — || October 21, 2003 || Kitt Peak || Spacewatch || — || align=right | 4.8 km || 
|-id=058 bgcolor=#d6d6d6
| 197058 ||  || — || October 21, 2003 || Socorro || LINEAR || EUP || align=right | 7.5 km || 
|-id=059 bgcolor=#d6d6d6
| 197059 ||  || — || October 19, 2003 || Kitt Peak || Spacewatch || — || align=right | 3.9 km || 
|-id=060 bgcolor=#d6d6d6
| 197060 ||  || — || October 20, 2003 || Palomar || NEAT || — || align=right | 3.3 km || 
|-id=061 bgcolor=#d6d6d6
| 197061 ||  || — || October 20, 2003 || Palomar || NEAT || EOS || align=right | 2.8 km || 
|-id=062 bgcolor=#d6d6d6
| 197062 ||  || — || October 20, 2003 || Kitt Peak || Spacewatch || THM || align=right | 3.1 km || 
|-id=063 bgcolor=#d6d6d6
| 197063 ||  || — || October 20, 2003 || Kitt Peak || Spacewatch || — || align=right | 2.7 km || 
|-id=064 bgcolor=#d6d6d6
| 197064 ||  || — || October 20, 2003 || Kitt Peak || Spacewatch || — || align=right | 4.2 km || 
|-id=065 bgcolor=#d6d6d6
| 197065 ||  || — || October 21, 2003 || Kitt Peak || Spacewatch || — || align=right | 3.0 km || 
|-id=066 bgcolor=#d6d6d6
| 197066 ||  || — || October 21, 2003 || Kitt Peak || Spacewatch || — || align=right | 3.3 km || 
|-id=067 bgcolor=#d6d6d6
| 197067 ||  || — || October 21, 2003 || Anderson Mesa || LONEOS || — || align=right | 3.5 km || 
|-id=068 bgcolor=#d6d6d6
| 197068 ||  || — || October 21, 2003 || Socorro || LINEAR || — || align=right | 4.0 km || 
|-id=069 bgcolor=#d6d6d6
| 197069 ||  || — || October 21, 2003 || Socorro || LINEAR || 628 || align=right | 3.1 km || 
|-id=070 bgcolor=#d6d6d6
| 197070 ||  || — || October 21, 2003 || Socorro || LINEAR || EMA || align=right | 6.1 km || 
|-id=071 bgcolor=#d6d6d6
| 197071 ||  || — || October 21, 2003 || Socorro || LINEAR || — || align=right | 4.2 km || 
|-id=072 bgcolor=#E9E9E9
| 197072 ||  || — || October 22, 2003 || Socorro || LINEAR || — || align=right | 6.1 km || 
|-id=073 bgcolor=#d6d6d6
| 197073 ||  || — || October 22, 2003 || Socorro || LINEAR || — || align=right | 5.0 km || 
|-id=074 bgcolor=#d6d6d6
| 197074 ||  || — || October 22, 2003 || Kitt Peak || Spacewatch || — || align=right | 3.2 km || 
|-id=075 bgcolor=#d6d6d6
| 197075 ||  || — || October 22, 2003 || Kitt Peak || Spacewatch || — || align=right | 4.9 km || 
|-id=076 bgcolor=#d6d6d6
| 197076 ||  || — || October 20, 2003 || Socorro || LINEAR || VER || align=right | 6.3 km || 
|-id=077 bgcolor=#d6d6d6
| 197077 ||  || — || October 20, 2003 || Kitt Peak || Spacewatch || EOS || align=right | 4.5 km || 
|-id=078 bgcolor=#d6d6d6
| 197078 ||  || — || October 21, 2003 || Kitt Peak || Spacewatch || HYG || align=right | 4.1 km || 
|-id=079 bgcolor=#d6d6d6
| 197079 ||  || — || October 21, 2003 || Kitt Peak || Spacewatch || — || align=right | 5.0 km || 
|-id=080 bgcolor=#d6d6d6
| 197080 ||  || — || October 21, 2003 || Palomar || NEAT || TEL || align=right | 1.9 km || 
|-id=081 bgcolor=#d6d6d6
| 197081 ||  || — || October 21, 2003 || Palomar || NEAT || — || align=right | 4.1 km || 
|-id=082 bgcolor=#d6d6d6
| 197082 ||  || — || October 21, 2003 || Palomar || NEAT || — || align=right | 3.0 km || 
|-id=083 bgcolor=#d6d6d6
| 197083 ||  || — || October 21, 2003 || Palomar || NEAT || EOS || align=right | 4.3 km || 
|-id=084 bgcolor=#d6d6d6
| 197084 ||  || — || October 21, 2003 || Socorro || LINEAR || — || align=right | 6.8 km || 
|-id=085 bgcolor=#d6d6d6
| 197085 ||  || — || October 21, 2003 || Socorro || LINEAR || — || align=right | 3.3 km || 
|-id=086 bgcolor=#d6d6d6
| 197086 ||  || — || October 21, 2003 || Palomar || NEAT || TRE || align=right | 3.6 km || 
|-id=087 bgcolor=#d6d6d6
| 197087 ||  || — || October 21, 2003 || Palomar || NEAT || KOR || align=right | 2.3 km || 
|-id=088 bgcolor=#d6d6d6
| 197088 ||  || — || October 21, 2003 || Palomar || NEAT || — || align=right | 4.1 km || 
|-id=089 bgcolor=#d6d6d6
| 197089 ||  || — || October 21, 2003 || Palomar || NEAT || — || align=right | 3.4 km || 
|-id=090 bgcolor=#d6d6d6
| 197090 ||  || — || October 21, 2003 || Palomar || NEAT || — || align=right | 4.5 km || 
|-id=091 bgcolor=#d6d6d6
| 197091 ||  || — || October 21, 2003 || Palomar || NEAT || KOR || align=right | 2.5 km || 
|-id=092 bgcolor=#d6d6d6
| 197092 ||  || — || October 21, 2003 || Palomar || NEAT || — || align=right | 3.4 km || 
|-id=093 bgcolor=#d6d6d6
| 197093 ||  || — || October 21, 2003 || Palomar || NEAT || EOS || align=right | 4.1 km || 
|-id=094 bgcolor=#d6d6d6
| 197094 ||  || — || October 22, 2003 || Socorro || LINEAR || EOS || align=right | 2.8 km || 
|-id=095 bgcolor=#d6d6d6
| 197095 ||  || — || October 22, 2003 || Socorro || LINEAR || HYG || align=right | 4.7 km || 
|-id=096 bgcolor=#d6d6d6
| 197096 ||  || — || October 22, 2003 || Kitt Peak || Spacewatch || — || align=right | 4.4 km || 
|-id=097 bgcolor=#d6d6d6
| 197097 ||  || — || October 22, 2003 || Kitt Peak || Spacewatch || — || align=right | 6.1 km || 
|-id=098 bgcolor=#d6d6d6
| 197098 ||  || — || October 23, 2003 || Anderson Mesa || LONEOS || — || align=right | 4.9 km || 
|-id=099 bgcolor=#d6d6d6
| 197099 ||  || — || October 23, 2003 || Anderson Mesa || LONEOS || HYG || align=right | 4.6 km || 
|-id=100 bgcolor=#d6d6d6
| 197100 ||  || — || October 23, 2003 || Anderson Mesa || LONEOS || — || align=right | 3.2 km || 
|}

197101–197200 

|-bgcolor=#d6d6d6
| 197101 ||  || — || October 23, 2003 || Anderson Mesa || LONEOS || — || align=right | 3.4 km || 
|-id=102 bgcolor=#d6d6d6
| 197102 ||  || — || October 20, 2003 || Kitt Peak || Spacewatch || 628 || align=right | 3.1 km || 
|-id=103 bgcolor=#d6d6d6
| 197103 ||  || — || October 20, 2003 || Socorro || LINEAR || — || align=right | 4.8 km || 
|-id=104 bgcolor=#d6d6d6
| 197104 ||  || — || October 20, 2003 || Kitt Peak || Spacewatch || — || align=right | 3.6 km || 
|-id=105 bgcolor=#d6d6d6
| 197105 ||  || — || October 20, 2003 || Kitt Peak || Spacewatch || — || align=right | 4.8 km || 
|-id=106 bgcolor=#d6d6d6
| 197106 ||  || — || October 21, 2003 || Kitt Peak || Spacewatch || KOR || align=right | 1.8 km || 
|-id=107 bgcolor=#d6d6d6
| 197107 ||  || — || October 21, 2003 || Kitt Peak || Spacewatch || — || align=right | 3.5 km || 
|-id=108 bgcolor=#d6d6d6
| 197108 ||  || — || October 21, 2003 || Socorro || LINEAR || — || align=right | 6.4 km || 
|-id=109 bgcolor=#d6d6d6
| 197109 ||  || — || October 21, 2003 || Kitt Peak || Spacewatch || — || align=right | 4.3 km || 
|-id=110 bgcolor=#d6d6d6
| 197110 ||  || — || October 21, 2003 || Kitt Peak || Spacewatch || — || align=right | 3.8 km || 
|-id=111 bgcolor=#d6d6d6
| 197111 ||  || — || October 22, 2003 || Socorro || LINEAR || — || align=right | 4.1 km || 
|-id=112 bgcolor=#d6d6d6
| 197112 ||  || — || October 22, 2003 || Haleakala || NEAT || — || align=right | 3.4 km || 
|-id=113 bgcolor=#d6d6d6
| 197113 ||  || — || October 22, 2003 || Socorro || LINEAR || TIR || align=right | 6.3 km || 
|-id=114 bgcolor=#d6d6d6
| 197114 ||  || — || October 22, 2003 || Kitt Peak || Spacewatch || — || align=right | 3.1 km || 
|-id=115 bgcolor=#d6d6d6
| 197115 ||  || — || October 22, 2003 || Kitt Peak || Spacewatch || KOR || align=right | 2.3 km || 
|-id=116 bgcolor=#d6d6d6
| 197116 ||  || — || October 23, 2003 || Kitt Peak || Spacewatch || — || align=right | 4.5 km || 
|-id=117 bgcolor=#d6d6d6
| 197117 ||  || — || October 23, 2003 || Kitt Peak || Spacewatch || — || align=right | 5.2 km || 
|-id=118 bgcolor=#E9E9E9
| 197118 ||  || — || October 23, 2003 || Kitt Peak || Spacewatch || — || align=right | 2.5 km || 
|-id=119 bgcolor=#d6d6d6
| 197119 ||  || — || October 23, 2003 || Kitt Peak || Spacewatch || — || align=right | 4.5 km || 
|-id=120 bgcolor=#d6d6d6
| 197120 ||  || — || October 21, 2003 || Anderson Mesa || LONEOS || — || align=right | 4.2 km || 
|-id=121 bgcolor=#d6d6d6
| 197121 ||  || — || October 21, 2003 || Kitt Peak || Spacewatch || URS || align=right | 4.7 km || 
|-id=122 bgcolor=#d6d6d6
| 197122 ||  || — || October 21, 2003 || Kitt Peak || Spacewatch || — || align=right | 4.2 km || 
|-id=123 bgcolor=#d6d6d6
| 197123 ||  || — || October 21, 2003 || Socorro || LINEAR || — || align=right | 4.7 km || 
|-id=124 bgcolor=#d6d6d6
| 197124 ||  || — || October 22, 2003 || Socorro || LINEAR || — || align=right | 5.1 km || 
|-id=125 bgcolor=#d6d6d6
| 197125 ||  || — || October 22, 2003 || Kitt Peak || Spacewatch || — || align=right | 4.6 km || 
|-id=126 bgcolor=#d6d6d6
| 197126 ||  || — || October 22, 2003 || Kitt Peak || Spacewatch || — || align=right | 4.4 km || 
|-id=127 bgcolor=#d6d6d6
| 197127 ||  || — || October 23, 2003 || Kitt Peak || Spacewatch || — || align=right | 4.8 km || 
|-id=128 bgcolor=#d6d6d6
| 197128 ||  || — || October 23, 2003 || Kitt Peak || Spacewatch || — || align=right | 3.8 km || 
|-id=129 bgcolor=#d6d6d6
| 197129 ||  || — || October 23, 2003 || Anderson Mesa || LONEOS || HYG || align=right | 3.9 km || 
|-id=130 bgcolor=#E9E9E9
| 197130 ||  || — || October 24, 2003 || Socorro || LINEAR || — || align=right | 3.8 km || 
|-id=131 bgcolor=#d6d6d6
| 197131 ||  || — || October 24, 2003 || Socorro || LINEAR || — || align=right | 2.5 km || 
|-id=132 bgcolor=#d6d6d6
| 197132 ||  || — || October 24, 2003 || Socorro || LINEAR || — || align=right | 4.7 km || 
|-id=133 bgcolor=#d6d6d6
| 197133 ||  || — || October 24, 2003 || Kitt Peak || Spacewatch || — || align=right | 3.7 km || 
|-id=134 bgcolor=#d6d6d6
| 197134 ||  || — || October 23, 2003 || Haleakala || NEAT || — || align=right | 5.1 km || 
|-id=135 bgcolor=#d6d6d6
| 197135 ||  || — || October 24, 2003 || Socorro || LINEAR || EOS || align=right | 2.9 km || 
|-id=136 bgcolor=#d6d6d6
| 197136 ||  || — || October 24, 2003 || Kitt Peak || Spacewatch || — || align=right | 3.9 km || 
|-id=137 bgcolor=#d6d6d6
| 197137 ||  || — || October 24, 2003 || Socorro || LINEAR || EOS || align=right | 3.1 km || 
|-id=138 bgcolor=#d6d6d6
| 197138 ||  || — || October 24, 2003 || Kitt Peak || Spacewatch || — || align=right | 2.9 km || 
|-id=139 bgcolor=#d6d6d6
| 197139 ||  || — || October 24, 2003 || Socorro || LINEAR || — || align=right | 5.2 km || 
|-id=140 bgcolor=#d6d6d6
| 197140 ||  || — || October 25, 2003 || Kitt Peak || Spacewatch || — || align=right | 3.5 km || 
|-id=141 bgcolor=#d6d6d6
| 197141 ||  || — || October 25, 2003 || Socorro || LINEAR || HYG || align=right | 5.1 km || 
|-id=142 bgcolor=#d6d6d6
| 197142 ||  || — || October 25, 2003 || Socorro || LINEAR || HYG || align=right | 3.5 km || 
|-id=143 bgcolor=#E9E9E9
| 197143 ||  || — || October 25, 2003 || Kitt Peak || Spacewatch || AGN || align=right | 1.3 km || 
|-id=144 bgcolor=#d6d6d6
| 197144 ||  || — || October 25, 2003 || Socorro || LINEAR || — || align=right | 4.3 km || 
|-id=145 bgcolor=#E9E9E9
| 197145 ||  || — || October 25, 2003 || Socorro || LINEAR || MIS || align=right | 4.0 km || 
|-id=146 bgcolor=#d6d6d6
| 197146 ||  || — || October 25, 2003 || Kitt Peak || Spacewatch || — || align=right | 2.8 km || 
|-id=147 bgcolor=#d6d6d6
| 197147 ||  || — || October 25, 2003 || Socorro || LINEAR || — || align=right | 5.5 km || 
|-id=148 bgcolor=#d6d6d6
| 197148 ||  || — || October 26, 2003 || Catalina || CSS || EOS || align=right | 6.1 km || 
|-id=149 bgcolor=#E9E9E9
| 197149 ||  || — || October 27, 2003 || Socorro || LINEAR || — || align=right | 2.7 km || 
|-id=150 bgcolor=#d6d6d6
| 197150 ||  || — || October 27, 2003 || Kitt Peak || Spacewatch || — || align=right | 8.0 km || 
|-id=151 bgcolor=#d6d6d6
| 197151 ||  || — || October 28, 2003 || Socorro || LINEAR || — || align=right | 4.5 km || 
|-id=152 bgcolor=#d6d6d6
| 197152 ||  || — || October 28, 2003 || Socorro || LINEAR || HYG || align=right | 5.4 km || 
|-id=153 bgcolor=#d6d6d6
| 197153 ||  || — || October 17, 2003 || Palomar || NEAT || — || align=right | 5.1 km || 
|-id=154 bgcolor=#d6d6d6
| 197154 ||  || — || October 28, 2003 || Haleakala || NEAT || — || align=right | 3.1 km || 
|-id=155 bgcolor=#d6d6d6
| 197155 ||  || — || October 29, 2003 || Kitt Peak || Spacewatch || TIR || align=right | 3.9 km || 
|-id=156 bgcolor=#d6d6d6
| 197156 ||  || — || October 29, 2003 || Kitt Peak || Spacewatch || URS || align=right | 6.2 km || 
|-id=157 bgcolor=#d6d6d6
| 197157 ||  || — || October 29, 2003 || Socorro || LINEAR || EOS || align=right | 3.2 km || 
|-id=158 bgcolor=#E9E9E9
| 197158 ||  || — || October 29, 2003 || Socorro || LINEAR || GEF || align=right | 2.4 km || 
|-id=159 bgcolor=#d6d6d6
| 197159 ||  || — || October 29, 2003 || Socorro || LINEAR || — || align=right | 8.4 km || 
|-id=160 bgcolor=#d6d6d6
| 197160 ||  || — || October 29, 2003 || Kitt Peak || Spacewatch || EOS || align=right | 3.9 km || 
|-id=161 bgcolor=#d6d6d6
| 197161 ||  || — || October 29, 2003 || Kitt Peak || Spacewatch || NAE || align=right | 3.3 km || 
|-id=162 bgcolor=#d6d6d6
| 197162 ||  || — || October 29, 2003 || Kitt Peak || Spacewatch || URS || align=right | 5.5 km || 
|-id=163 bgcolor=#d6d6d6
| 197163 ||  || — || October 30, 2003 || Socorro || LINEAR || — || align=right | 4.7 km || 
|-id=164 bgcolor=#d6d6d6
| 197164 ||  || — || October 29, 2003 || Catalina || CSS || — || align=right | 4.9 km || 
|-id=165 bgcolor=#d6d6d6
| 197165 ||  || — || October 30, 2003 || Haleakala || NEAT || — || align=right | 5.4 km || 
|-id=166 bgcolor=#E9E9E9
| 197166 ||  || — || October 25, 2003 || Kitt Peak || Spacewatch || AGN || align=right | 1.7 km || 
|-id=167 bgcolor=#E9E9E9
| 197167 ||  || — || October 25, 2003 || Socorro || LINEAR || PAD || align=right | 3.1 km || 
|-id=168 bgcolor=#d6d6d6
| 197168 ||  || — || October 26, 2003 || Kitt Peak || Spacewatch || — || align=right | 4.2 km || 
|-id=169 bgcolor=#d6d6d6
| 197169 ||  || — || October 27, 2003 || Kitt Peak || Spacewatch || — || align=right | 3.1 km || 
|-id=170 bgcolor=#d6d6d6
| 197170 ||  || — || October 27, 2003 || Socorro || LINEAR || EMA || align=right | 6.3 km || 
|-id=171 bgcolor=#d6d6d6
| 197171 ||  || — || October 28, 2003 || Socorro || LINEAR || — || align=right | 5.0 km || 
|-id=172 bgcolor=#d6d6d6
| 197172 ||  || — || October 28, 2003 || Socorro || LINEAR || — || align=right | 3.2 km || 
|-id=173 bgcolor=#d6d6d6
| 197173 ||  || — || October 28, 2003 || Socorro || LINEAR || — || align=right | 4.6 km || 
|-id=174 bgcolor=#d6d6d6
| 197174 ||  || — || October 29, 2003 || Anderson Mesa || LONEOS || HYG || align=right | 4.0 km || 
|-id=175 bgcolor=#d6d6d6
| 197175 ||  || — || October 29, 2003 || Anderson Mesa || LONEOS || — || align=right | 4.5 km || 
|-id=176 bgcolor=#d6d6d6
| 197176 ||  || — || October 22, 2003 || Kitt Peak || M. W. Buie || — || align=right | 2.4 km || 
|-id=177 bgcolor=#d6d6d6
| 197177 ||  || — || October 22, 2003 || Kitt Peak || M. W. Buie || — || align=right | 4.9 km || 
|-id=178 bgcolor=#d6d6d6
| 197178 ||  || — || October 16, 2003 || Kitt Peak || Spacewatch || EOS || align=right | 3.6 km || 
|-id=179 bgcolor=#E9E9E9
| 197179 ||  || — || October 16, 2003 || Kitt Peak || Spacewatch || AGN || align=right | 1.8 km || 
|-id=180 bgcolor=#d6d6d6
| 197180 ||  || — || October 16, 2003 || Kitt Peak || Spacewatch || — || align=right | 4.9 km || 
|-id=181 bgcolor=#E9E9E9
| 197181 ||  || — || October 16, 2003 || Kitt Peak || Spacewatch || HOF || align=right | 3.4 km || 
|-id=182 bgcolor=#d6d6d6
| 197182 ||  || — || October 17, 2003 || Kitt Peak || Spacewatch || EOS || align=right | 3.1 km || 
|-id=183 bgcolor=#d6d6d6
| 197183 ||  || — || October 20, 2003 || Palomar || NEAT || — || align=right | 5.0 km || 
|-id=184 bgcolor=#d6d6d6
| 197184 ||  || — || October 20, 2003 || Socorro || LINEAR || — || align=right | 4.6 km || 
|-id=185 bgcolor=#E9E9E9
| 197185 ||  || — || October 20, 2003 || Kitt Peak || Spacewatch || — || align=right | 3.7 km || 
|-id=186 bgcolor=#d6d6d6
| 197186 ||  || — || October 22, 2003 || Palomar || NEAT || — || align=right | 5.2 km || 
|-id=187 bgcolor=#E9E9E9
| 197187 ||  || — || October 20, 2003 || Kitt Peak || Spacewatch || — || align=right | 4.8 km || 
|-id=188 bgcolor=#d6d6d6
| 197188 ||  || — || October 24, 2003 || Socorro || LINEAR || — || align=right | 5.1 km || 
|-id=189 bgcolor=#d6d6d6
| 197189 Raymond ||  ||  || October 19, 2003 || Apache Point || SDSS || — || align=right | 3.4 km || 
|-id=190 bgcolor=#E9E9E9
| 197190 ||  || — || October 16, 2003 || Palomar || NEAT || HOF || align=right | 2.9 km || 
|-id=191 bgcolor=#fefefe
| 197191 || 2003 VE || — || November 3, 2003 || Socorro || LINEAR || H || align=right | 1.1 km || 
|-id=192 bgcolor=#d6d6d6
| 197192 Kazinczy || 2003 VK ||  || November 5, 2003 || Piszkéstető || K. Sárneczky, S. Mészáros || EOS || align=right | 2.9 km || 
|-id=193 bgcolor=#d6d6d6
| 197193 || 2003 VX || — || November 5, 2003 || Socorro || LINEAR || — || align=right | 5.3 km || 
|-id=194 bgcolor=#d6d6d6
| 197194 ||  || — || November 2, 2003 || Socorro || LINEAR || — || align=right | 4.5 km || 
|-id=195 bgcolor=#d6d6d6
| 197195 ||  || — || November 15, 2003 || Kitt Peak || Spacewatch || — || align=right | 4.0 km || 
|-id=196 bgcolor=#d6d6d6
| 197196 Jamestaylor ||  ||  || November 15, 2003 || Junk Bond || D. Healy || — || align=right | 4.8 km || 
|-id=197 bgcolor=#d6d6d6
| 197197 ||  || — || November 15, 2003 || Palomar || NEAT || — || align=right | 4.1 km || 
|-id=198 bgcolor=#d6d6d6
| 197198 ||  || — || November 15, 2003 || Palomar || NEAT || — || align=right | 6.7 km || 
|-id=199 bgcolor=#d6d6d6
| 197199 ||  || — || November 2, 2003 || Socorro || LINEAR || EOS || align=right | 5.4 km || 
|-id=200 bgcolor=#d6d6d6
| 197200 || 2003 WJ || — || November 16, 2003 || Catalina || CSS || — || align=right | 4.0 km || 
|}

197201–197300 

|-bgcolor=#d6d6d6
| 197201 || 2003 WL || — || November 16, 2003 || Catalina || CSS || — || align=right | 4.2 km || 
|-id=202 bgcolor=#d6d6d6
| 197202 ||  || — || November 16, 2003 || Catalina || CSS || — || align=right | 3.7 km || 
|-id=203 bgcolor=#d6d6d6
| 197203 ||  || — || November 16, 2003 || Catalina || CSS || — || align=right | 6.1 km || 
|-id=204 bgcolor=#d6d6d6
| 197204 ||  || — || November 16, 2003 || Catalina || CSS || EOS || align=right | 3.3 km || 
|-id=205 bgcolor=#d6d6d6
| 197205 ||  || — || November 16, 2003 || Catalina || CSS || TRE || align=right | 4.6 km || 
|-id=206 bgcolor=#d6d6d6
| 197206 ||  || — || November 16, 2003 || Catalina || CSS || — || align=right | 6.2 km || 
|-id=207 bgcolor=#d6d6d6
| 197207 ||  || — || November 16, 2003 || Catalina || CSS || — || align=right | 3.0 km || 
|-id=208 bgcolor=#d6d6d6
| 197208 ||  || — || November 18, 2003 || Fountain Hills || C. W. Juels, P. R. Holvorcem || — || align=right | 3.6 km || 
|-id=209 bgcolor=#d6d6d6
| 197209 ||  || — || November 16, 2003 || Kitt Peak || Spacewatch || TIR || align=right | 4.3 km || 
|-id=210 bgcolor=#d6d6d6
| 197210 ||  || — || November 18, 2003 || Palomar || NEAT || EOS || align=right | 3.4 km || 
|-id=211 bgcolor=#d6d6d6
| 197211 ||  || — || November 18, 2003 || Palomar || NEAT || — || align=right | 3.3 km || 
|-id=212 bgcolor=#d6d6d6
| 197212 ||  || — || November 19, 2003 || Socorro || LINEAR || — || align=right | 6.8 km || 
|-id=213 bgcolor=#d6d6d6
| 197213 ||  || — || November 19, 2003 || Socorro || LINEAR || — || align=right | 3.9 km || 
|-id=214 bgcolor=#d6d6d6
| 197214 ||  || — || November 18, 2003 || Kitt Peak || Spacewatch || — || align=right | 5.8 km || 
|-id=215 bgcolor=#fefefe
| 197215 ||  || — || November 20, 2003 || Socorro || LINEAR || H || align=right data-sort-value="0.89" | 890 m || 
|-id=216 bgcolor=#fefefe
| 197216 ||  || — || November 20, 2003 || Nogales || M. Schwartz, P. R. Holvorcem || H || align=right data-sort-value="0.79" | 790 m || 
|-id=217 bgcolor=#d6d6d6
| 197217 ||  || — || November 16, 2003 || Kitt Peak || Spacewatch || — || align=right | 4.0 km || 
|-id=218 bgcolor=#d6d6d6
| 197218 ||  || — || November 16, 2003 || Kitt Peak || Spacewatch || EOS || align=right | 3.2 km || 
|-id=219 bgcolor=#d6d6d6
| 197219 ||  || — || November 18, 2003 || Kitt Peak || Spacewatch || — || align=right | 3.9 km || 
|-id=220 bgcolor=#d6d6d6
| 197220 ||  || — || November 18, 2003 || Palomar || NEAT || EOS || align=right | 2.8 km || 
|-id=221 bgcolor=#d6d6d6
| 197221 ||  || — || November 18, 2003 || Kitt Peak || Spacewatch || HYG || align=right | 4.2 km || 
|-id=222 bgcolor=#d6d6d6
| 197222 ||  || — || November 19, 2003 || Palomar || NEAT || — || align=right | 4.6 km || 
|-id=223 bgcolor=#d6d6d6
| 197223 ||  || — || November 19, 2003 || Socorro || LINEAR || — || align=right | 4.1 km || 
|-id=224 bgcolor=#d6d6d6
| 197224 ||  || — || November 19, 2003 || Catalina || CSS || — || align=right | 3.6 km || 
|-id=225 bgcolor=#d6d6d6
| 197225 ||  || — || November 19, 2003 || Kitt Peak || Spacewatch || — || align=right | 5.5 km || 
|-id=226 bgcolor=#d6d6d6
| 197226 ||  || — || November 19, 2003 || Kitt Peak || Spacewatch || — || align=right | 5.3 km || 
|-id=227 bgcolor=#d6d6d6
| 197227 ||  || — || November 19, 2003 || Kitt Peak || Spacewatch || — || align=right | 4.3 km || 
|-id=228 bgcolor=#d6d6d6
| 197228 ||  || — || November 19, 2003 || Kitt Peak || Spacewatch || — || align=right | 5.1 km || 
|-id=229 bgcolor=#fefefe
| 197229 ||  || — || November 16, 2003 || Catalina || CSS || H || align=right | 1.00 km || 
|-id=230 bgcolor=#d6d6d6
| 197230 ||  || — || November 19, 2003 || Palomar || NEAT || EOS || align=right | 3.4 km || 
|-id=231 bgcolor=#d6d6d6
| 197231 ||  || — || November 19, 2003 || Palomar || NEAT || — || align=right | 3.1 km || 
|-id=232 bgcolor=#d6d6d6
| 197232 ||  || — || November 18, 2003 || Palomar || NEAT || — || align=right | 4.1 km || 
|-id=233 bgcolor=#d6d6d6
| 197233 ||  || — || November 19, 2003 || Socorro || LINEAR || URS || align=right | 5.7 km || 
|-id=234 bgcolor=#d6d6d6
| 197234 ||  || — || November 19, 2003 || Socorro || LINEAR || — || align=right | 5.0 km || 
|-id=235 bgcolor=#d6d6d6
| 197235 ||  || — || November 20, 2003 || Socorro || LINEAR || — || align=right | 3.5 km || 
|-id=236 bgcolor=#d6d6d6
| 197236 ||  || — || November 18, 2003 || Palomar || NEAT || — || align=right | 4.5 km || 
|-id=237 bgcolor=#d6d6d6
| 197237 ||  || — || November 18, 2003 || Kitt Peak || Spacewatch || — || align=right | 4.3 km || 
|-id=238 bgcolor=#d6d6d6
| 197238 ||  || — || November 18, 2003 || Kitt Peak || Spacewatch || — || align=right | 5.2 km || 
|-id=239 bgcolor=#d6d6d6
| 197239 ||  || — || November 18, 2003 || Kitt Peak || Spacewatch || — || align=right | 5.5 km || 
|-id=240 bgcolor=#d6d6d6
| 197240 ||  || — || November 18, 2003 || Palomar || NEAT || — || align=right | 4.1 km || 
|-id=241 bgcolor=#d6d6d6
| 197241 ||  || — || November 18, 2003 || Palomar || NEAT || — || align=right | 4.0 km || 
|-id=242 bgcolor=#d6d6d6
| 197242 ||  || — || November 19, 2003 || Kitt Peak || Spacewatch || — || align=right | 3.6 km || 
|-id=243 bgcolor=#d6d6d6
| 197243 ||  || — || November 19, 2003 || Kitt Peak || Spacewatch || — || align=right | 4.6 km || 
|-id=244 bgcolor=#d6d6d6
| 197244 ||  || — || November 19, 2003 || Kitt Peak || Spacewatch || VER || align=right | 5.1 km || 
|-id=245 bgcolor=#d6d6d6
| 197245 ||  || — || November 19, 2003 || Kitt Peak || Spacewatch || — || align=right | 3.2 km || 
|-id=246 bgcolor=#d6d6d6
| 197246 ||  || — || November 19, 2003 || Kitt Peak || Spacewatch || — || align=right | 4.5 km || 
|-id=247 bgcolor=#d6d6d6
| 197247 ||  || — || November 19, 2003 || Kitt Peak || Spacewatch || — || align=right | 2.8 km || 
|-id=248 bgcolor=#d6d6d6
| 197248 ||  || — || November 19, 2003 || Kitt Peak || Spacewatch || — || align=right | 4.1 km || 
|-id=249 bgcolor=#d6d6d6
| 197249 ||  || — || November 19, 2003 || Kitt Peak || Spacewatch || — || align=right | 4.4 km || 
|-id=250 bgcolor=#d6d6d6
| 197250 ||  || — || November 20, 2003 || Kitt Peak || Spacewatch || THM || align=right | 3.3 km || 
|-id=251 bgcolor=#d6d6d6
| 197251 ||  || — || November 20, 2003 || Palomar || NEAT || — || align=right | 4.2 km || 
|-id=252 bgcolor=#d6d6d6
| 197252 ||  || — || November 20, 2003 || Palomar || NEAT || — || align=right | 5.6 km || 
|-id=253 bgcolor=#d6d6d6
| 197253 ||  || — || November 20, 2003 || Socorro || LINEAR || — || align=right | 4.9 km || 
|-id=254 bgcolor=#d6d6d6
| 197254 ||  || — || November 20, 2003 || Socorro || LINEAR || — || align=right | 5.9 km || 
|-id=255 bgcolor=#d6d6d6
| 197255 ||  || — || November 20, 2003 || Socorro || LINEAR || — || align=right | 4.7 km || 
|-id=256 bgcolor=#d6d6d6
| 197256 ||  || — || November 20, 2003 || Socorro || LINEAR || LUT || align=right | 8.1 km || 
|-id=257 bgcolor=#d6d6d6
| 197257 ||  || — || November 20, 2003 || Socorro || LINEAR || — || align=right | 4.9 km || 
|-id=258 bgcolor=#fefefe
| 197258 ||  || — || November 20, 2003 || Socorro || LINEAR || H || align=right | 1.0 km || 
|-id=259 bgcolor=#d6d6d6
| 197259 ||  || — || November 19, 2003 || Socorro || LINEAR || — || align=right | 4.5 km || 
|-id=260 bgcolor=#d6d6d6
| 197260 ||  || — || November 19, 2003 || Socorro || LINEAR || — || align=right | 3.8 km || 
|-id=261 bgcolor=#d6d6d6
| 197261 ||  || — || November 20, 2003 || Socorro || LINEAR || — || align=right | 4.2 km || 
|-id=262 bgcolor=#d6d6d6
| 197262 ||  || — || November 20, 2003 || Socorro || LINEAR || HYG || align=right | 3.8 km || 
|-id=263 bgcolor=#d6d6d6
| 197263 ||  || — || November 20, 2003 || Socorro || LINEAR || — || align=right | 4.4 km || 
|-id=264 bgcolor=#d6d6d6
| 197264 ||  || — || November 20, 2003 || Socorro || LINEAR || — || align=right | 4.4 km || 
|-id=265 bgcolor=#d6d6d6
| 197265 ||  || — || November 20, 2003 || Socorro || LINEAR || — || align=right | 6.3 km || 
|-id=266 bgcolor=#d6d6d6
| 197266 ||  || — || November 23, 2003 || Needville || Needville Obs. || EOS || align=right | 3.7 km || 
|-id=267 bgcolor=#d6d6d6
| 197267 ||  || — || November 16, 2003 || Catalina || CSS || EOS || align=right | 2.9 km || 
|-id=268 bgcolor=#d6d6d6
| 197268 ||  || — || November 16, 2003 || Kitt Peak || Spacewatch || — || align=right | 3.6 km || 
|-id=269 bgcolor=#d6d6d6
| 197269 ||  || — || November 19, 2003 || Anderson Mesa || LONEOS || ALA || align=right | 7.9 km || 
|-id=270 bgcolor=#d6d6d6
| 197270 ||  || — || November 19, 2003 || Anderson Mesa || LONEOS || — || align=right | 3.8 km || 
|-id=271 bgcolor=#d6d6d6
| 197271 ||  || — || November 19, 2003 || Anderson Mesa || LONEOS || — || align=right | 4.4 km || 
|-id=272 bgcolor=#d6d6d6
| 197272 ||  || — || November 19, 2003 || Anderson Mesa || LONEOS || — || align=right | 4.8 km || 
|-id=273 bgcolor=#d6d6d6
| 197273 ||  || — || November 19, 2003 || Anderson Mesa || LONEOS || — || align=right | 2.9 km || 
|-id=274 bgcolor=#d6d6d6
| 197274 ||  || — || November 19, 2003 || Anderson Mesa || LONEOS || KOR || align=right | 2.1 km || 
|-id=275 bgcolor=#d6d6d6
| 197275 ||  || — || November 19, 2003 || Anderson Mesa || LONEOS || — || align=right | 4.6 km || 
|-id=276 bgcolor=#d6d6d6
| 197276 ||  || — || November 20, 2003 || Palomar || NEAT || LUT || align=right | 7.6 km || 
|-id=277 bgcolor=#d6d6d6
| 197277 ||  || — || November 20, 2003 || Socorro || LINEAR || — || align=right | 5.7 km || 
|-id=278 bgcolor=#E9E9E9
| 197278 ||  || — || November 21, 2003 || Catalina || CSS || EUN || align=right | 2.4 km || 
|-id=279 bgcolor=#d6d6d6
| 197279 ||  || — || November 21, 2003 || Socorro || LINEAR || — || align=right | 3.2 km || 
|-id=280 bgcolor=#d6d6d6
| 197280 ||  || — || November 21, 2003 || Socorro || LINEAR || — || align=right | 4.9 km || 
|-id=281 bgcolor=#d6d6d6
| 197281 ||  || — || November 21, 2003 || Socorro || LINEAR || — || align=right | 4.4 km || 
|-id=282 bgcolor=#d6d6d6
| 197282 ||  || — || November 21, 2003 || Socorro || LINEAR || — || align=right | 10 km || 
|-id=283 bgcolor=#d6d6d6
| 197283 ||  || — || November 21, 2003 || Palomar || NEAT || — || align=right | 3.3 km || 
|-id=284 bgcolor=#d6d6d6
| 197284 ||  || — || November 24, 2003 || Junk Bond || D. Healy || — || align=right | 4.5 km || 
|-id=285 bgcolor=#d6d6d6
| 197285 ||  || — || November 20, 2003 || Socorro || LINEAR || — || align=right | 4.1 km || 
|-id=286 bgcolor=#d6d6d6
| 197286 ||  || — || November 20, 2003 || Socorro || LINEAR || — || align=right | 5.0 km || 
|-id=287 bgcolor=#d6d6d6
| 197287 ||  || — || November 20, 2003 || Socorro || LINEAR || HYG || align=right | 3.4 km || 
|-id=288 bgcolor=#E9E9E9
| 197288 ||  || — || November 20, 2003 || Socorro || LINEAR || — || align=right | 3.5 km || 
|-id=289 bgcolor=#d6d6d6
| 197289 ||  || — || November 20, 2003 || Socorro || LINEAR || — || align=right | 4.8 km || 
|-id=290 bgcolor=#d6d6d6
| 197290 ||  || — || November 20, 2003 || Socorro || LINEAR || — || align=right | 4.2 km || 
|-id=291 bgcolor=#d6d6d6
| 197291 ||  || — || November 20, 2003 || Socorro || LINEAR || — || align=right | 5.4 km || 
|-id=292 bgcolor=#d6d6d6
| 197292 ||  || — || November 20, 2003 || Socorro || LINEAR || — || align=right | 4.8 km || 
|-id=293 bgcolor=#d6d6d6
| 197293 ||  || — || November 20, 2003 || Socorro || LINEAR || EOS || align=right | 3.2 km || 
|-id=294 bgcolor=#d6d6d6
| 197294 ||  || — || November 20, 2003 || Socorro || LINEAR || HYG || align=right | 5.6 km || 
|-id=295 bgcolor=#d6d6d6
| 197295 ||  || — || November 20, 2003 || Socorro || LINEAR || EOS || align=right | 3.0 km || 
|-id=296 bgcolor=#d6d6d6
| 197296 ||  || — || November 20, 2003 || Socorro || LINEAR || — || align=right | 5.4 km || 
|-id=297 bgcolor=#d6d6d6
| 197297 ||  || — || November 20, 2003 || Socorro || LINEAR || — || align=right | 3.6 km || 
|-id=298 bgcolor=#d6d6d6
| 197298 ||  || — || November 20, 2003 || Socorro || LINEAR || — || align=right | 4.9 km || 
|-id=299 bgcolor=#d6d6d6
| 197299 ||  || — || November 21, 2003 || Kitt Peak || Spacewatch || TELslow || align=right | 2.4 km || 
|-id=300 bgcolor=#d6d6d6
| 197300 ||  || — || November 21, 2003 || Kitt Peak || Spacewatch || — || align=right | 3.4 km || 
|}

197301–197400 

|-bgcolor=#d6d6d6
| 197301 ||  || — || November 21, 2003 || Socorro || LINEAR || — || align=right | 4.3 km || 
|-id=302 bgcolor=#d6d6d6
| 197302 ||  || — || November 21, 2003 || Palomar || NEAT || — || align=right | 3.4 km || 
|-id=303 bgcolor=#d6d6d6
| 197303 ||  || — || November 21, 2003 || Palomar || NEAT || — || align=right | 4.9 km || 
|-id=304 bgcolor=#d6d6d6
| 197304 ||  || — || November 21, 2003 || Socorro || LINEAR || — || align=right | 4.0 km || 
|-id=305 bgcolor=#d6d6d6
| 197305 ||  || — || November 21, 2003 || Socorro || LINEAR || EOS || align=right | 2.9 km || 
|-id=306 bgcolor=#d6d6d6
| 197306 ||  || — || November 21, 2003 || Socorro || LINEAR || MEL || align=right | 7.0 km || 
|-id=307 bgcolor=#d6d6d6
| 197307 ||  || — || November 21, 2003 || Socorro || LINEAR || — || align=right | 3.9 km || 
|-id=308 bgcolor=#d6d6d6
| 197308 ||  || — || November 21, 2003 || Socorro || LINEAR || — || align=right | 6.7 km || 
|-id=309 bgcolor=#d6d6d6
| 197309 ||  || — || November 21, 2003 || Socorro || LINEAR || slow || align=right | 4.1 km || 
|-id=310 bgcolor=#fefefe
| 197310 ||  || — || November 21, 2003 || Socorro || LINEAR || H || align=right data-sort-value="0.99" | 990 m || 
|-id=311 bgcolor=#d6d6d6
| 197311 ||  || — || November 21, 2003 || Socorro || LINEAR || — || align=right | 4.2 km || 
|-id=312 bgcolor=#d6d6d6
| 197312 ||  || — || November 21, 2003 || Socorro || LINEAR || — || align=right | 7.9 km || 
|-id=313 bgcolor=#d6d6d6
| 197313 ||  || — || November 19, 2003 || Catalina || CSS || — || align=right | 5.6 km || 
|-id=314 bgcolor=#d6d6d6
| 197314 ||  || — || November 20, 2003 || Socorro || LINEAR || VER || align=right | 5.0 km || 
|-id=315 bgcolor=#d6d6d6
| 197315 ||  || — || November 21, 2003 || Socorro || LINEAR || — || align=right | 4.1 km || 
|-id=316 bgcolor=#d6d6d6
| 197316 ||  || — || November 23, 2003 || Palomar || NEAT || — || align=right | 6.0 km || 
|-id=317 bgcolor=#d6d6d6
| 197317 ||  || — || November 23, 2003 || Catalina || CSS || TIR || align=right | 4.4 km || 
|-id=318 bgcolor=#d6d6d6
| 197318 ||  || — || November 23, 2003 || Socorro || LINEAR || — || align=right | 6.5 km || 
|-id=319 bgcolor=#d6d6d6
| 197319 ||  || — || November 23, 2003 || Kitt Peak || Spacewatch || — || align=right | 4.1 km || 
|-id=320 bgcolor=#d6d6d6
| 197320 ||  || — || November 23, 2003 || Kitt Peak || Spacewatch || — || align=right | 4.8 km || 
|-id=321 bgcolor=#d6d6d6
| 197321 ||  || — || November 23, 2003 || Needville || Needville Obs. || — || align=right | 4.7 km || 
|-id=322 bgcolor=#d6d6d6
| 197322 ||  || — || November 24, 2003 || Socorro || LINEAR || — || align=right | 3.5 km || 
|-id=323 bgcolor=#d6d6d6
| 197323 ||  || — || November 24, 2003 || Anderson Mesa || LONEOS || — || align=right | 5.7 km || 
|-id=324 bgcolor=#d6d6d6
| 197324 ||  || — || November 24, 2003 || Nogales || Tenagra II Obs. || — || align=right | 4.5 km || 
|-id=325 bgcolor=#d6d6d6
| 197325 ||  || — || November 24, 2003 || Palomar || NEAT || EUP || align=right | 6.2 km || 
|-id=326 bgcolor=#d6d6d6
| 197326 ||  || — || November 25, 2003 || Kingsnake || J. V. McClusky || CHA || align=right | 3.5 km || 
|-id=327 bgcolor=#d6d6d6
| 197327 ||  || — || November 26, 2003 || Anderson Mesa || LONEOS || — || align=right | 5.4 km || 
|-id=328 bgcolor=#d6d6d6
| 197328 ||  || — || November 24, 2003 || Palomar || NEAT || — || align=right | 4.9 km || 
|-id=329 bgcolor=#d6d6d6
| 197329 ||  || — || November 28, 2003 || Kitt Peak || Spacewatch || KOR || align=right | 1.7 km || 
|-id=330 bgcolor=#d6d6d6
| 197330 ||  || — || November 19, 2003 || Kitt Peak || Spacewatch || KOR || align=right | 1.9 km || 
|-id=331 bgcolor=#d6d6d6
| 197331 ||  || — || November 19, 2003 || Palomar || NEAT || EOS || align=right | 2.8 km || 
|-id=332 bgcolor=#fefefe
| 197332 ||  || — || November 19, 2003 || Socorro || LINEAR || H || align=right data-sort-value="0.89" | 890 m || 
|-id=333 bgcolor=#d6d6d6
| 197333 ||  || — || November 20, 2003 || Catalina || CSS || EOS || align=right | 3.4 km || 
|-id=334 bgcolor=#d6d6d6
| 197334 ||  || — || November 20, 2003 || Catalina || CSS || — || align=right | 5.8 km || 
|-id=335 bgcolor=#d6d6d6
| 197335 ||  || — || November 18, 2003 || Kitt Peak || Spacewatch || — || align=right | 3.4 km || 
|-id=336 bgcolor=#d6d6d6
| 197336 ||  || — || November 19, 2003 || Kitt Peak || Spacewatch || — || align=right | 3.6 km || 
|-id=337 bgcolor=#d6d6d6
| 197337 ||  || — || November 19, 2003 || Kitt Peak || Spacewatch || — || align=right | 2.8 km || 
|-id=338 bgcolor=#d6d6d6
| 197338 ||  || — || November 19, 2003 || Anderson Mesa || LONEOS || — || align=right | 3.2 km || 
|-id=339 bgcolor=#d6d6d6
| 197339 ||  || — || November 19, 2003 || Kitt Peak || Spacewatch || — || align=right | 5.5 km || 
|-id=340 bgcolor=#d6d6d6
| 197340 ||  || — || November 20, 2003 || Kitt Peak || M. W. Buie || KOR || align=right | 2.1 km || 
|-id=341 bgcolor=#d6d6d6
| 197341 ||  || — || November 21, 2003 || Kitt Peak || M. W. Buie || — || align=right | 5.5 km || 
|-id=342 bgcolor=#d6d6d6
| 197342 ||  || — || November 20, 2003 || Socorro || LINEAR || — || align=right | 2.9 km || 
|-id=343 bgcolor=#d6d6d6
| 197343 ||  || — || December 1, 2003 || Kitt Peak || Spacewatch || EOS || align=right | 3.4 km || 
|-id=344 bgcolor=#d6d6d6
| 197344 ||  || — || December 1, 2003 || Socorro || LINEAR || — || align=right | 2.7 km || 
|-id=345 bgcolor=#d6d6d6
| 197345 ||  || — || December 1, 2003 || Socorro || LINEAR || — || align=right | 4.8 km || 
|-id=346 bgcolor=#d6d6d6
| 197346 ||  || — || December 3, 2003 || Socorro || LINEAR || — || align=right | 5.3 km || 
|-id=347 bgcolor=#d6d6d6
| 197347 ||  || — || December 1, 2003 || Socorro || LINEAR || — || align=right | 4.6 km || 
|-id=348 bgcolor=#d6d6d6
| 197348 ||  || — || December 3, 2003 || Socorro || LINEAR || — || align=right | 2.1 km || 
|-id=349 bgcolor=#d6d6d6
| 197349 ||  || — || December 4, 2003 || Socorro || LINEAR || — || align=right | 2.7 km || 
|-id=350 bgcolor=#d6d6d6
| 197350 ||  || — || December 4, 2003 || Socorro || LINEAR || — || align=right | 8.5 km || 
|-id=351 bgcolor=#d6d6d6
| 197351 ||  || — || December 4, 2003 || Socorro || LINEAR || — || align=right | 6.2 km || 
|-id=352 bgcolor=#d6d6d6
| 197352 ||  || — || December 4, 2003 || Socorro || LINEAR || — || align=right | 4.3 km || 
|-id=353 bgcolor=#d6d6d6
| 197353 ||  || — || December 4, 2003 || Socorro || LINEAR || — || align=right | 5.6 km || 
|-id=354 bgcolor=#d6d6d6
| 197354 ||  || — || December 5, 2003 || Socorro || LINEAR || Tj (2.97) || align=right | 8.6 km || 
|-id=355 bgcolor=#d6d6d6
| 197355 ||  || — || December 10, 2003 || Palomar || NEAT || — || align=right | 5.1 km || 
|-id=356 bgcolor=#d6d6d6
| 197356 ||  || — || December 11, 2003 || Needville || Needville Obs. || — || align=right | 5.4 km || 
|-id=357 bgcolor=#d6d6d6
| 197357 ||  || — || December 14, 2003 || Palomar || NEAT || — || align=right | 4.1 km || 
|-id=358 bgcolor=#d6d6d6
| 197358 ||  || — || December 14, 2003 || Palomar || NEAT || EOS || align=right | 3.5 km || 
|-id=359 bgcolor=#fefefe
| 197359 ||  || — || December 4, 2003 || Socorro || LINEAR || H || align=right data-sort-value="0.92" | 920 m || 
|-id=360 bgcolor=#d6d6d6
| 197360 ||  || — || December 15, 2003 || Palomar || NEAT || EOS || align=right | 3.3 km || 
|-id=361 bgcolor=#d6d6d6
| 197361 ||  || — || December 15, 2003 || Palomar || NEAT || — || align=right | 3.8 km || 
|-id=362 bgcolor=#d6d6d6
| 197362 ||  || — || December 14, 2003 || Kitt Peak || Spacewatch || — || align=right | 4.4 km || 
|-id=363 bgcolor=#d6d6d6
| 197363 ||  || — || December 14, 2003 || Kitt Peak || Spacewatch || — || align=right | 4.7 km || 
|-id=364 bgcolor=#d6d6d6
| 197364 ||  || — || December 14, 2003 || Kitt Peak || Spacewatch || HYG || align=right | 6.3 km || 
|-id=365 bgcolor=#d6d6d6
| 197365 ||  || — || December 14, 2003 || Kitt Peak || Spacewatch || 7:4 || align=right | 6.7 km || 
|-id=366 bgcolor=#d6d6d6
| 197366 ||  || — || December 14, 2003 || Kitt Peak || Spacewatch || — || align=right | 3.8 km || 
|-id=367 bgcolor=#d6d6d6
| 197367 ||  || — || December 3, 2003 || Socorro || LINEAR || — || align=right | 5.9 km || 
|-id=368 bgcolor=#d6d6d6
| 197368 ||  || — || December 1, 2003 || Kitt Peak || Spacewatch || — || align=right | 2.8 km || 
|-id=369 bgcolor=#d6d6d6
| 197369 ||  || — || December 1, 2003 || Socorro || LINEAR || — || align=right | 7.4 km || 
|-id=370 bgcolor=#d6d6d6
| 197370 ||  || — || December 1, 2003 || Kitt Peak || Spacewatch || THM || align=right | 3.3 km || 
|-id=371 bgcolor=#d6d6d6
| 197371 ||  || — || December 1, 2003 || Kitt Peak || Spacewatch || — || align=right | 4.8 km || 
|-id=372 bgcolor=#E9E9E9
| 197372 ||  || — || December 3, 2003 || Anderson Mesa || LONEOS || MAR || align=right | 2.1 km || 
|-id=373 bgcolor=#d6d6d6
| 197373 ||  || — || December 3, 2003 || Socorro || LINEAR || EOS || align=right | 3.1 km || 
|-id=374 bgcolor=#d6d6d6
| 197374 ||  || — || December 3, 2003 || Socorro || LINEAR || EOS || align=right | 3.4 km || 
|-id=375 bgcolor=#E9E9E9
| 197375 ||  || — || December 4, 2003 || Socorro || LINEAR || — || align=right | 3.7 km || 
|-id=376 bgcolor=#d6d6d6
| 197376 ||  || — || December 4, 2003 || Socorro || LINEAR || HYG || align=right | 4.7 km || 
|-id=377 bgcolor=#d6d6d6
| 197377 ||  || — || December 5, 2003 || Socorro || LINEAR || — || align=right | 3.6 km || 
|-id=378 bgcolor=#d6d6d6
| 197378 ||  || — || December 14, 2003 || Kitt Peak || Spacewatch || EOS || align=right | 2.5 km || 
|-id=379 bgcolor=#d6d6d6
| 197379 ||  || — || December 14, 2003 || Kitt Peak || Spacewatch || HYG || align=right | 4.6 km || 
|-id=380 bgcolor=#d6d6d6
| 197380 || 2003 YN || — || December 16, 2003 || Anderson Mesa || LONEOS || TIR || align=right | 5.3 km || 
|-id=381 bgcolor=#fefefe
| 197381 || 2003 YZ || — || December 17, 2003 || Socorro || LINEAR || H || align=right | 1.1 km || 
|-id=382 bgcolor=#E9E9E9
| 197382 ||  || — || December 19, 2003 || Catalina || CSS || — || align=right | 5.7 km || 
|-id=383 bgcolor=#d6d6d6
| 197383 ||  || — || December 17, 2003 || Anderson Mesa || LONEOS || TIR || align=right | 4.8 km || 
|-id=384 bgcolor=#d6d6d6
| 197384 ||  || — || December 16, 2003 || Kitt Peak || Spacewatch || — || align=right | 3.5 km || 
|-id=385 bgcolor=#d6d6d6
| 197385 ||  || — || December 16, 2003 || Kitt Peak || Spacewatch || — || align=right | 2.7 km || 
|-id=386 bgcolor=#d6d6d6
| 197386 ||  || — || December 17, 2003 || Socorro || LINEAR || — || align=right | 4.0 km || 
|-id=387 bgcolor=#d6d6d6
| 197387 ||  || — || December 17, 2003 || Socorro || LINEAR || — || align=right | 3.9 km || 
|-id=388 bgcolor=#d6d6d6
| 197388 ||  || — || December 17, 2003 || Socorro || LINEAR || — || align=right | 4.4 km || 
|-id=389 bgcolor=#d6d6d6
| 197389 ||  || — || December 17, 2003 || Socorro || LINEAR || — || align=right | 7.7 km || 
|-id=390 bgcolor=#d6d6d6
| 197390 ||  || — || December 17, 2003 || Anderson Mesa || LONEOS || — || align=right | 5.9 km || 
|-id=391 bgcolor=#d6d6d6
| 197391 ||  || — || December 17, 2003 || Anderson Mesa || LONEOS || — || align=right | 5.6 km || 
|-id=392 bgcolor=#d6d6d6
| 197392 ||  || — || December 16, 2003 || Anderson Mesa || LONEOS || — || align=right | 5.0 km || 
|-id=393 bgcolor=#d6d6d6
| 197393 ||  || — || December 17, 2003 || Socorro || LINEAR || — || align=right | 3.7 km || 
|-id=394 bgcolor=#d6d6d6
| 197394 ||  || — || December 17, 2003 || Socorro || LINEAR || — || align=right | 5.8 km || 
|-id=395 bgcolor=#d6d6d6
| 197395 ||  || — || December 18, 2003 || Socorro || LINEAR || — || align=right | 5.1 km || 
|-id=396 bgcolor=#d6d6d6
| 197396 ||  || — || December 17, 2003 || Črni Vrh || Črni Vrh || THM || align=right | 5.6 km || 
|-id=397 bgcolor=#d6d6d6
| 197397 ||  || — || December 17, 2003 || Kitt Peak || Spacewatch || MEL || align=right | 5.6 km || 
|-id=398 bgcolor=#d6d6d6
| 197398 ||  || — || December 17, 2003 || Palomar || NEAT || — || align=right | 6.5 km || 
|-id=399 bgcolor=#d6d6d6
| 197399 ||  || — || December 18, 2003 || Socorro || LINEAR || — || align=right | 5.4 km || 
|-id=400 bgcolor=#d6d6d6
| 197400 ||  || — || December 18, 2003 || Socorro || LINEAR || CRO || align=right | 5.4 km || 
|}

197401–197500 

|-bgcolor=#d6d6d6
| 197401 ||  || — || December 19, 2003 || Socorro || LINEAR || — || align=right | 5.7 km || 
|-id=402 bgcolor=#d6d6d6
| 197402 ||  || — || December 18, 2003 || Socorro || LINEAR || THM || align=right | 5.0 km || 
|-id=403 bgcolor=#d6d6d6
| 197403 ||  || — || December 18, 2003 || Socorro || LINEAR || — || align=right | 3.1 km || 
|-id=404 bgcolor=#d6d6d6
| 197404 ||  || — || December 19, 2003 || Socorro || LINEAR || HYG || align=right | 4.1 km || 
|-id=405 bgcolor=#d6d6d6
| 197405 ||  || — || December 19, 2003 || Kitt Peak || Spacewatch || HYG || align=right | 5.1 km || 
|-id=406 bgcolor=#d6d6d6
| 197406 ||  || — || December 19, 2003 || Kitt Peak || Spacewatch || 7:4 || align=right | 5.3 km || 
|-id=407 bgcolor=#d6d6d6
| 197407 ||  || — || December 17, 2003 || Socorro || LINEAR || — || align=right | 6.0 km || 
|-id=408 bgcolor=#d6d6d6
| 197408 ||  || — || December 17, 2003 || Kitt Peak || Spacewatch || — || align=right | 3.4 km || 
|-id=409 bgcolor=#d6d6d6
| 197409 ||  || — || December 18, 2003 || Socorro || LINEAR || HYG || align=right | 5.2 km || 
|-id=410 bgcolor=#d6d6d6
| 197410 ||  || — || December 18, 2003 || Socorro || LINEAR || VER || align=right | 3.9 km || 
|-id=411 bgcolor=#d6d6d6
| 197411 ||  || — || December 18, 2003 || Socorro || LINEAR || — || align=right | 4.3 km || 
|-id=412 bgcolor=#d6d6d6
| 197412 ||  || — || December 18, 2003 || Socorro || LINEAR || — || align=right | 4.5 km || 
|-id=413 bgcolor=#d6d6d6
| 197413 ||  || — || December 18, 2003 || Socorro || LINEAR || — || align=right | 4.0 km || 
|-id=414 bgcolor=#d6d6d6
| 197414 ||  || — || December 18, 2003 || Socorro || LINEAR || THM || align=right | 4.6 km || 
|-id=415 bgcolor=#d6d6d6
| 197415 ||  || — || December 18, 2003 || Socorro || LINEAR || — || align=right | 5.0 km || 
|-id=416 bgcolor=#d6d6d6
| 197416 ||  || — || December 18, 2003 || Socorro || LINEAR || HYG || align=right | 4.9 km || 
|-id=417 bgcolor=#d6d6d6
| 197417 ||  || — || December 19, 2003 || Socorro || LINEAR || EOS || align=right | 3.9 km || 
|-id=418 bgcolor=#d6d6d6
| 197418 ||  || — || December 19, 2003 || Socorro || LINEAR || — || align=right | 4.0 km || 
|-id=419 bgcolor=#d6d6d6
| 197419 ||  || — || December 19, 2003 || Kitt Peak || Spacewatch || — || align=right | 4.3 km || 
|-id=420 bgcolor=#d6d6d6
| 197420 ||  || — || December 19, 2003 || Socorro || LINEAR || — || align=right | 5.5 km || 
|-id=421 bgcolor=#d6d6d6
| 197421 ||  || — || December 19, 2003 || Socorro || LINEAR || — || align=right | 3.1 km || 
|-id=422 bgcolor=#d6d6d6
| 197422 ||  || — || December 20, 2003 || Socorro || LINEAR || — || align=right | 4.5 km || 
|-id=423 bgcolor=#d6d6d6
| 197423 ||  || — || December 19, 2003 || Kitt Peak || Spacewatch || — || align=right | 3.8 km || 
|-id=424 bgcolor=#d6d6d6
| 197424 ||  || — || December 20, 2003 || Socorro || LINEAR || — || align=right | 4.3 km || 
|-id=425 bgcolor=#d6d6d6
| 197425 ||  || — || December 21, 2003 || Socorro || LINEAR || HYG || align=right | 5.3 km || 
|-id=426 bgcolor=#d6d6d6
| 197426 ||  || — || December 18, 2003 || Socorro || LINEAR || — || align=right | 5.4 km || 
|-id=427 bgcolor=#d6d6d6
| 197427 ||  || — || December 18, 2003 || Socorro || LINEAR || — || align=right | 4.7 km || 
|-id=428 bgcolor=#d6d6d6
| 197428 ||  || — || December 18, 2003 || Socorro || LINEAR || — || align=right | 5.4 km || 
|-id=429 bgcolor=#d6d6d6
| 197429 ||  || — || December 18, 2003 || Socorro || LINEAR || — || align=right | 6.5 km || 
|-id=430 bgcolor=#d6d6d6
| 197430 ||  || — || December 18, 2003 || Socorro || LINEAR || — || align=right | 7.0 km || 
|-id=431 bgcolor=#E9E9E9
| 197431 ||  || — || December 18, 2003 || Socorro || LINEAR || — || align=right | 3.5 km || 
|-id=432 bgcolor=#d6d6d6
| 197432 ||  || — || December 18, 2003 || Socorro || LINEAR || ALA || align=right | 7.8 km || 
|-id=433 bgcolor=#d6d6d6
| 197433 ||  || — || December 18, 2003 || Socorro || LINEAR || — || align=right | 6.5 km || 
|-id=434 bgcolor=#d6d6d6
| 197434 ||  || — || December 18, 2003 || Socorro || LINEAR || EOS || align=right | 3.4 km || 
|-id=435 bgcolor=#d6d6d6
| 197435 ||  || — || December 18, 2003 || Socorro || LINEAR || — || align=right | 6.2 km || 
|-id=436 bgcolor=#d6d6d6
| 197436 ||  || — || December 19, 2003 || Socorro || LINEAR || — || align=right | 4.4 km || 
|-id=437 bgcolor=#d6d6d6
| 197437 ||  || — || December 19, 2003 || Socorro || LINEAR || HYG || align=right | 4.8 km || 
|-id=438 bgcolor=#d6d6d6
| 197438 ||  || — || December 19, 2003 || Socorro || LINEAR || — || align=right | 5.1 km || 
|-id=439 bgcolor=#d6d6d6
| 197439 ||  || — || December 19, 2003 || Socorro || LINEAR || — || align=right | 4.6 km || 
|-id=440 bgcolor=#d6d6d6
| 197440 ||  || — || December 19, 2003 || Socorro || LINEAR || THM || align=right | 5.9 km || 
|-id=441 bgcolor=#d6d6d6
| 197441 ||  || — || December 22, 2003 || Socorro || LINEAR || 7:4 || align=right | 5.4 km || 
|-id=442 bgcolor=#d6d6d6
| 197442 ||  || — || December 19, 2003 || Socorro || LINEAR || VER || align=right | 5.9 km || 
|-id=443 bgcolor=#d6d6d6
| 197443 ||  || — || December 19, 2003 || Socorro || LINEAR || — || align=right | 3.8 km || 
|-id=444 bgcolor=#d6d6d6
| 197444 ||  || — || December 19, 2003 || Socorro || LINEAR || — || align=right | 6.8 km || 
|-id=445 bgcolor=#FA8072
| 197445 ||  || — || December 19, 2003 || Socorro || LINEAR || H || align=right | 1.3 km || 
|-id=446 bgcolor=#d6d6d6
| 197446 ||  || — || December 21, 2003 || Socorro || LINEAR || — || align=right | 5.0 km || 
|-id=447 bgcolor=#d6d6d6
| 197447 ||  || — || December 21, 2003 || Socorro || LINEAR || HYG || align=right | 4.5 km || 
|-id=448 bgcolor=#d6d6d6
| 197448 ||  || — || December 22, 2003 || Kitt Peak || Spacewatch || HYG || align=right | 4.8 km || 
|-id=449 bgcolor=#d6d6d6
| 197449 ||  || — || December 22, 2003 || Goodricke-Pigott || V. Reddy || — || align=right | 6.7 km || 
|-id=450 bgcolor=#d6d6d6
| 197450 ||  || — || December 25, 2003 || Haleakala || NEAT || — || align=right | 5.1 km || 
|-id=451 bgcolor=#d6d6d6
| 197451 ||  || — || December 25, 2003 || Črni Vrh || Črni Vrh || — || align=right | 4.2 km || 
|-id=452 bgcolor=#d6d6d6
| 197452 ||  || — || December 27, 2003 || Socorro || LINEAR || VER || align=right | 4.9 km || 
|-id=453 bgcolor=#d6d6d6
| 197453 ||  || — || December 27, 2003 || Socorro || LINEAR || TIR || align=right | 5.5 km || 
|-id=454 bgcolor=#fefefe
| 197454 ||  || — || December 17, 2003 || Socorro || LINEAR || H || align=right data-sort-value="0.89" | 890 m || 
|-id=455 bgcolor=#d6d6d6
| 197455 ||  || — || December 27, 2003 || Socorro || LINEAR || HYG || align=right | 3.5 km || 
|-id=456 bgcolor=#d6d6d6
| 197456 ||  || — || December 25, 2003 || Kitt Peak || Spacewatch || — || align=right | 4.4 km || 
|-id=457 bgcolor=#d6d6d6
| 197457 ||  || — || December 28, 2003 || Kitt Peak || Spacewatch || KOR || align=right | 2.2 km || 
|-id=458 bgcolor=#d6d6d6
| 197458 ||  || — || December 27, 2003 || Socorro || LINEAR || ALA || align=right | 8.7 km || 
|-id=459 bgcolor=#d6d6d6
| 197459 ||  || — || December 27, 2003 || Socorro || LINEAR || LIX || align=right | 5.6 km || 
|-id=460 bgcolor=#d6d6d6
| 197460 ||  || — || December 27, 2003 || Socorro || LINEAR || — || align=right | 4.8 km || 
|-id=461 bgcolor=#d6d6d6
| 197461 ||  || — || December 27, 2003 || Socorro || LINEAR || — || align=right | 3.9 km || 
|-id=462 bgcolor=#d6d6d6
| 197462 ||  || — || December 27, 2003 || Socorro || LINEAR || — || align=right | 3.0 km || 
|-id=463 bgcolor=#fefefe
| 197463 ||  || — || December 27, 2003 || Socorro || LINEAR || H || align=right | 1.2 km || 
|-id=464 bgcolor=#d6d6d6
| 197464 ||  || — || December 28, 2003 || Socorro || LINEAR || HYG || align=right | 4.8 km || 
|-id=465 bgcolor=#d6d6d6
| 197465 ||  || — || December 28, 2003 || Socorro || LINEAR || HYG || align=right | 5.9 km || 
|-id=466 bgcolor=#d6d6d6
| 197466 ||  || — || December 17, 2003 || Palomar || NEAT || — || align=right | 4.4 km || 
|-id=467 bgcolor=#d6d6d6
| 197467 ||  || — || December 28, 2003 || Socorro || LINEAR || — || align=right | 4.9 km || 
|-id=468 bgcolor=#d6d6d6
| 197468 ||  || — || December 28, 2003 || Socorro || LINEAR || — || align=right | 5.6 km || 
|-id=469 bgcolor=#d6d6d6
| 197469 ||  || — || December 28, 2003 || Socorro || LINEAR || — || align=right | 5.1 km || 
|-id=470 bgcolor=#d6d6d6
| 197470 ||  || — || December 28, 2003 || Socorro || LINEAR || — || align=right | 4.7 km || 
|-id=471 bgcolor=#d6d6d6
| 197471 ||  || — || December 28, 2003 || Socorro || LINEAR || HYG || align=right | 4.3 km || 
|-id=472 bgcolor=#d6d6d6
| 197472 ||  || — || December 16, 2003 || Kitt Peak || Spacewatch || — || align=right | 3.7 km || 
|-id=473 bgcolor=#d6d6d6
| 197473 ||  || — || December 17, 2003 || Socorro || LINEAR || — || align=right | 5.4 km || 
|-id=474 bgcolor=#d6d6d6
| 197474 ||  || — || December 17, 2003 || Socorro || LINEAR || EOS || align=right | 3.7 km || 
|-id=475 bgcolor=#d6d6d6
| 197475 ||  || — || January 13, 2004 || Anderson Mesa || LONEOS || TRP || align=right | 4.7 km || 
|-id=476 bgcolor=#d6d6d6
| 197476 ||  || — || January 13, 2004 || Anderson Mesa || LONEOS || — || align=right | 4.3 km || 
|-id=477 bgcolor=#d6d6d6
| 197477 ||  || — || January 3, 2004 || Pla D'Arguines || Pla D'Arguines Obs. || — || align=right | 3.9 km || 
|-id=478 bgcolor=#d6d6d6
| 197478 ||  || — || January 16, 2004 || Palomar || NEAT || SHU3:2 || align=right | 9.1 km || 
|-id=479 bgcolor=#fefefe
| 197479 ||  || — || January 16, 2004 || Palomar || NEAT || H || align=right data-sort-value="0.87" | 870 m || 
|-id=480 bgcolor=#E9E9E9
| 197480 ||  || — || January 17, 2004 || Kitt Peak || Spacewatch || INO || align=right | 2.0 km || 
|-id=481 bgcolor=#d6d6d6
| 197481 ||  || — || January 17, 2004 || Palomar || NEAT || THM || align=right | 3.7 km || 
|-id=482 bgcolor=#fefefe
| 197482 ||  || — || January 19, 2004 || Socorro || LINEAR || H || align=right | 1.2 km || 
|-id=483 bgcolor=#d6d6d6
| 197483 ||  || — || January 19, 2004 || Anderson Mesa || LONEOS || — || align=right | 4.7 km || 
|-id=484 bgcolor=#d6d6d6
| 197484 ||  || — || January 19, 2004 || Kitt Peak || Spacewatch || — || align=right | 5.0 km || 
|-id=485 bgcolor=#fefefe
| 197485 ||  || — || January 19, 2004 || Socorro || LINEAR || H || align=right data-sort-value="0.81" | 810 m || 
|-id=486 bgcolor=#d6d6d6
| 197486 ||  || — || January 18, 2004 || Palomar || NEAT || — || align=right | 3.3 km || 
|-id=487 bgcolor=#E9E9E9
| 197487 ||  || — || January 20, 2004 || Socorro || LINEAR || — || align=right | 3.7 km || 
|-id=488 bgcolor=#d6d6d6
| 197488 ||  || — || January 21, 2004 || Socorro || LINEAR || — || align=right | 5.7 km || 
|-id=489 bgcolor=#d6d6d6
| 197489 ||  || — || January 21, 2004 || Socorro || LINEAR || — || align=right | 5.4 km || 
|-id=490 bgcolor=#d6d6d6
| 197490 ||  || — || January 21, 2004 || Socorro || LINEAR || — || align=right | 4.3 km || 
|-id=491 bgcolor=#fefefe
| 197491 ||  || — || January 23, 2004 || Anderson Mesa || LONEOS || H || align=right | 1.0 km || 
|-id=492 bgcolor=#d6d6d6
| 197492 ||  || — || January 21, 2004 || Socorro || LINEAR || — || align=right | 4.1 km || 
|-id=493 bgcolor=#fefefe
| 197493 ||  || — || January 27, 2004 || Socorro || LINEAR || H || align=right | 1.1 km || 
|-id=494 bgcolor=#d6d6d6
| 197494 ||  || — || January 26, 2004 || Anderson Mesa || LONEOS || — || align=right | 4.2 km || 
|-id=495 bgcolor=#d6d6d6
| 197495 ||  || — || January 26, 2004 || Anderson Mesa || LONEOS || HYG || align=right | 4.3 km || 
|-id=496 bgcolor=#d6d6d6
| 197496 ||  || — || January 28, 2004 || Socorro || LINEAR || EUP || align=right | 5.4 km || 
|-id=497 bgcolor=#d6d6d6
| 197497 ||  || — || January 28, 2004 || Socorro || LINEAR || EUP || align=right | 8.4 km || 
|-id=498 bgcolor=#fefefe
| 197498 ||  || — || January 28, 2004 || Socorro || LINEAR || H || align=right data-sort-value="0.82" | 820 m || 
|-id=499 bgcolor=#fefefe
| 197499 ||  || — || January 22, 2004 || Socorro || LINEAR || H || align=right | 1.3 km || 
|-id=500 bgcolor=#d6d6d6
| 197500 ||  || — || January 24, 2004 || Socorro || LINEAR || — || align=right | 5.0 km || 
|}

197501–197600 

|-bgcolor=#d6d6d6
| 197501 ||  || — || January 25, 2004 || Haleakala || NEAT || 7:4 || align=right | 6.7 km || 
|-id=502 bgcolor=#fefefe
| 197502 ||  || — || January 30, 2004 || Catalina || CSS || H || align=right data-sort-value="0.77" | 770 m || 
|-id=503 bgcolor=#d6d6d6
| 197503 ||  || — || January 26, 2004 || Anderson Mesa || LONEOS || KOR || align=right | 2.3 km || 
|-id=504 bgcolor=#d6d6d6
| 197504 ||  || — || January 28, 2004 || Kitt Peak || Spacewatch || — || align=right | 4.1 km || 
|-id=505 bgcolor=#d6d6d6
| 197505 ||  || — || January 31, 2004 || Anderson Mesa || LONEOS || TIR || align=right | 3.9 km || 
|-id=506 bgcolor=#d6d6d6
| 197506 ||  || — || January 31, 2004 || Catalina || CSS || EUP || align=right | 6.5 km || 
|-id=507 bgcolor=#d6d6d6
| 197507 ||  || — || January 21, 2004 || Socorro || LINEAR || — || align=right | 5.7 km || 
|-id=508 bgcolor=#d6d6d6
| 197508 ||  || — || January 16, 2004 || Kitt Peak || Spacewatch || — || align=right | 4.5 km || 
|-id=509 bgcolor=#d6d6d6
| 197509 ||  || — || January 18, 2004 || Kitt Peak || Spacewatch || — || align=right | 6.0 km || 
|-id=510 bgcolor=#fefefe
| 197510 ||  || — || February 9, 2004 || Anderson Mesa || LONEOS || H || align=right data-sort-value="0.79" | 790 m || 
|-id=511 bgcolor=#d6d6d6
| 197511 ||  || — || February 11, 2004 || Kitt Peak || Spacewatch || THM || align=right | 3.3 km || 
|-id=512 bgcolor=#d6d6d6
| 197512 ||  || — || February 12, 2004 || Kitt Peak || Spacewatch || — || align=right | 3.7 km || 
|-id=513 bgcolor=#d6d6d6
| 197513 ||  || — || February 11, 2004 || Palomar || NEAT || — || align=right | 5.7 km || 
|-id=514 bgcolor=#fefefe
| 197514 ||  || — || February 14, 2004 || Socorro || LINEAR || H || align=right data-sort-value="0.82" | 820 m || 
|-id=515 bgcolor=#d6d6d6
| 197515 ||  || — || February 14, 2004 || Socorro || LINEAR || — || align=right | 3.3 km || 
|-id=516 bgcolor=#d6d6d6
| 197516 ||  || — || February 11, 2004 || Kitt Peak || Spacewatch || — || align=right | 4.1 km || 
|-id=517 bgcolor=#d6d6d6
| 197517 ||  || — || February 12, 2004 || Palomar || NEAT || — || align=right | 3.7 km || 
|-id=518 bgcolor=#d6d6d6
| 197518 ||  || — || February 14, 2004 || Palomar || NEAT || — || align=right | 5.7 km || 
|-id=519 bgcolor=#d6d6d6
| 197519 ||  || — || February 17, 2004 || Desert Eagle || W. K. Y. Yeung || — || align=right | 6.1 km || 
|-id=520 bgcolor=#d6d6d6
| 197520 ||  || — || February 16, 2004 || Kitt Peak || Spacewatch || — || align=right | 4.1 km || 
|-id=521 bgcolor=#fefefe
| 197521 ||  || — || February 17, 2004 || Catalina || CSS || H || align=right data-sort-value="0.89" | 890 m || 
|-id=522 bgcolor=#d6d6d6
| 197522 ||  || — || February 18, 2004 || Socorro || LINEAR || — || align=right | 5.7 km || 
|-id=523 bgcolor=#fefefe
| 197523 ||  || — || February 23, 2004 || Socorro || LINEAR || — || align=right data-sort-value="0.97" | 970 m || 
|-id=524 bgcolor=#fefefe
| 197524 ||  || — || February 16, 2004 || Kitt Peak || Spacewatch || — || align=right data-sort-value="0.79" | 790 m || 
|-id=525 bgcolor=#d6d6d6
| 197525 Versteeg ||  ||  || February 22, 2004 || Kitt Peak || M. W. Buie || THM || align=right | 2.8 km || 
|-id=526 bgcolor=#d6d6d6
| 197526 ||  || — || March 10, 2004 || Catalina || CSS || — || align=right | 4.4 km || 
|-id=527 bgcolor=#d6d6d6
| 197527 ||  || — || March 12, 2004 || Palomar || NEAT || — || align=right | 5.4 km || 
|-id=528 bgcolor=#d6d6d6
| 197528 ||  || — || March 14, 2004 || Kitt Peak || Spacewatch || HIL3:2 || align=right | 7.0 km || 
|-id=529 bgcolor=#d6d6d6
| 197529 ||  || — || March 14, 2004 || Kitt Peak || Spacewatch || 7:4 || align=right | 4.4 km || 
|-id=530 bgcolor=#fefefe
| 197530 ||  || — || March 15, 2004 || Kitt Peak || Spacewatch || FLO || align=right data-sort-value="0.87" | 870 m || 
|-id=531 bgcolor=#fefefe
| 197531 ||  || — || March 15, 2004 || Kitt Peak || Spacewatch || — || align=right data-sort-value="0.72" | 720 m || 
|-id=532 bgcolor=#fefefe
| 197532 ||  || — || March 15, 2004 || Palomar || NEAT || H || align=right | 1.2 km || 
|-id=533 bgcolor=#fefefe
| 197533 ||  || — || March 15, 2004 || Palomar || NEAT || — || align=right | 1.2 km || 
|-id=534 bgcolor=#d6d6d6
| 197534 ||  || — || March 12, 2004 || Palomar || NEAT || — || align=right | 3.6 km || 
|-id=535 bgcolor=#fefefe
| 197535 ||  || — || March 12, 2004 || Palomar || NEAT || — || align=right data-sort-value="0.94" | 940 m || 
|-id=536 bgcolor=#d6d6d6
| 197536 ||  || — || March 14, 2004 || Socorro || LINEAR || — || align=right | 3.9 km || 
|-id=537 bgcolor=#d6d6d6
| 197537 ||  || — || March 15, 2004 || Kitt Peak || Spacewatch || HIL3:2 || align=right | 7.1 km || 
|-id=538 bgcolor=#fefefe
| 197538 ||  || — || March 15, 2004 || Catalina || CSS || — || align=right | 1.1 km || 
|-id=539 bgcolor=#fefefe
| 197539 ||  || — || March 14, 2004 || Palomar || NEAT || — || align=right data-sort-value="0.88" | 880 m || 
|-id=540 bgcolor=#fefefe
| 197540 ||  || — || March 14, 2004 || Palomar || NEAT || FLO || align=right data-sort-value="0.91" | 910 m || 
|-id=541 bgcolor=#fefefe
| 197541 ||  || — || March 15, 2004 || Kitt Peak || Spacewatch || — || align=right data-sort-value="0.90" | 900 m || 
|-id=542 bgcolor=#d6d6d6
| 197542 ||  || — || March 15, 2004 || Kitt Peak || Spacewatch || THM || align=right | 4.6 km || 
|-id=543 bgcolor=#fefefe
| 197543 ||  || — || March 17, 2004 || Socorro || LINEAR || PHO || align=right | 1.8 km || 
|-id=544 bgcolor=#d6d6d6
| 197544 ||  || — || March 16, 2004 || Catalina || CSS || EMA || align=right | 6.3 km || 
|-id=545 bgcolor=#d6d6d6
| 197545 ||  || — || March 16, 2004 || Catalina || CSS || — || align=right | 2.9 km || 
|-id=546 bgcolor=#fefefe
| 197546 ||  || — || March 23, 2004 || Kitt Peak || Spacewatch || — || align=right data-sort-value="0.85" | 850 m || 
|-id=547 bgcolor=#fefefe
| 197547 ||  || — || March 17, 2004 || Kitt Peak || Spacewatch || — || align=right | 1.6 km || 
|-id=548 bgcolor=#fefefe
| 197548 ||  || — || March 29, 2004 || Socorro || LINEAR || PHO || align=right | 1.6 km || 
|-id=549 bgcolor=#fefefe
| 197549 ||  || — || March 16, 2004 || Kitt Peak || Spacewatch || FLO || align=right | 1.0 km || 
|-id=550 bgcolor=#fefefe
| 197550 ||  || — || March 17, 2004 || Socorro || LINEAR || — || align=right | 1.1 km || 
|-id=551 bgcolor=#fefefe
| 197551 ||  || — || March 17, 2004 || Kitt Peak || Spacewatch || FLO || align=right data-sort-value="0.74" | 740 m || 
|-id=552 bgcolor=#fefefe
| 197552 ||  || — || March 20, 2004 || Socorro || LINEAR || PHO || align=right | 1.5 km || 
|-id=553 bgcolor=#d6d6d6
| 197553 ||  || — || March 18, 2004 || Kitt Peak || Spacewatch || — || align=right | 5.1 km || 
|-id=554 bgcolor=#d6d6d6
| 197554 ||  || — || March 23, 2004 || Socorro || LINEAR || 3:2 || align=right | 8.2 km || 
|-id=555 bgcolor=#fefefe
| 197555 ||  || — || March 22, 2004 || Socorro || LINEAR || — || align=right data-sort-value="0.92" | 920 m || 
|-id=556 bgcolor=#fefefe
| 197556 ||  || — || March 23, 2004 || Socorro || LINEAR || — || align=right data-sort-value="0.97" | 970 m || 
|-id=557 bgcolor=#fefefe
| 197557 ||  || — || March 23, 2004 || Socorro || LINEAR || FLO || align=right | 1.0 km || 
|-id=558 bgcolor=#d6d6d6
| 197558 ||  || — || March 26, 2004 || Socorro || LINEAR || HIL3:2 || align=right | 8.5 km || 
|-id=559 bgcolor=#fefefe
| 197559 ||  || — || March 27, 2004 || Socorro || LINEAR || FLO || align=right data-sort-value="0.81" | 810 m || 
|-id=560 bgcolor=#fefefe
| 197560 ||  || — || March 27, 2004 || Socorro || LINEAR || FLO || align=right data-sort-value="0.91" | 910 m || 
|-id=561 bgcolor=#fefefe
| 197561 ||  || — || March 19, 2004 || Socorro || LINEAR || — || align=right | 1.3 km || 
|-id=562 bgcolor=#fefefe
| 197562 ||  || — || March 27, 2004 || Anderson Mesa || LONEOS || FLO || align=right data-sort-value="0.86" | 860 m || 
|-id=563 bgcolor=#C2FFFF
| 197563 ||  || — || March 22, 2004 || Socorro || LINEAR || L4 || align=right | 15 km || 
|-id=564 bgcolor=#FA8072
| 197564 ||  || — || April 12, 2004 || Siding Spring || SSS || — || align=right | 1.5 km || 
|-id=565 bgcolor=#fefefe
| 197565 ||  || — || April 12, 2004 || Anderson Mesa || LONEOS || FLO || align=right data-sort-value="0.94" | 940 m || 
|-id=566 bgcolor=#fefefe
| 197566 ||  || — || April 12, 2004 || Kitt Peak || Spacewatch || FLO || align=right data-sort-value="0.99" | 990 m || 
|-id=567 bgcolor=#fefefe
| 197567 ||  || — || April 9, 2004 || Siding Spring || SSS || — || align=right | 1.1 km || 
|-id=568 bgcolor=#d6d6d6
| 197568 ||  || — || April 14, 2004 || Socorro || LINEAR || EUP || align=right | 5.5 km || 
|-id=569 bgcolor=#fefefe
| 197569 ||  || — || April 12, 2004 || Anderson Mesa || LONEOS || — || align=right data-sort-value="0.92" | 920 m || 
|-id=570 bgcolor=#fefefe
| 197570 ||  || — || April 12, 2004 || Palomar || NEAT || — || align=right | 1.0 km || 
|-id=571 bgcolor=#fefefe
| 197571 ||  || — || April 12, 2004 || Anderson Mesa || LONEOS || — || align=right | 1.2 km || 
|-id=572 bgcolor=#fefefe
| 197572 ||  || — || April 12, 2004 || Palomar || NEAT || — || align=right | 1.3 km || 
|-id=573 bgcolor=#fefefe
| 197573 ||  || — || April 12, 2004 || Kitt Peak || Spacewatch || — || align=right data-sort-value="0.89" | 890 m || 
|-id=574 bgcolor=#fefefe
| 197574 ||  || — || April 12, 2004 || Kitt Peak || Spacewatch || — || align=right | 1.2 km || 
|-id=575 bgcolor=#fefefe
| 197575 ||  || — || April 13, 2004 || Siding Spring || SSS || H || align=right | 1.2 km || 
|-id=576 bgcolor=#fefefe
| 197576 ||  || — || April 12, 2004 || Kitt Peak || Spacewatch || — || align=right data-sort-value="0.88" | 880 m || 
|-id=577 bgcolor=#d6d6d6
| 197577 ||  || — || April 12, 2004 || Kitt Peak || Spacewatch || THM || align=right | 3.1 km || 
|-id=578 bgcolor=#fefefe
| 197578 ||  || — || April 12, 2004 || Anderson Mesa || LONEOS || FLO || align=right data-sort-value="0.75" | 750 m || 
|-id=579 bgcolor=#fefefe
| 197579 || 2004 HP || — || April 16, 2004 || Socorro || LINEAR || — || align=right | 1.3 km || 
|-id=580 bgcolor=#fefefe
| 197580 ||  || — || April 20, 2004 || Desert Eagle || W. K. Y. Yeung || FLO || align=right data-sort-value="0.64" | 640 m || 
|-id=581 bgcolor=#fefefe
| 197581 ||  || — || April 20, 2004 || Socorro || LINEAR || — || align=right | 1.1 km || 
|-id=582 bgcolor=#fefefe
| 197582 ||  || — || April 16, 2004 || Socorro || LINEAR || — || align=right | 1.1 km || 
|-id=583 bgcolor=#fefefe
| 197583 ||  || — || April 17, 2004 || Socorro || LINEAR || ERI || align=right | 1.9 km || 
|-id=584 bgcolor=#fefefe
| 197584 ||  || — || April 17, 2004 || Socorro || LINEAR || — || align=right | 1.0 km || 
|-id=585 bgcolor=#fefefe
| 197585 ||  || — || April 17, 2004 || Socorro || LINEAR || — || align=right | 1.3 km || 
|-id=586 bgcolor=#C2FFFF
| 197586 ||  || — || April 19, 2004 || Socorro || LINEAR || L4 || align=right | 16 km || 
|-id=587 bgcolor=#fefefe
| 197587 ||  || — || April 19, 2004 || Socorro || LINEAR || NYS || align=right data-sort-value="0.82" | 820 m || 
|-id=588 bgcolor=#FFC2E0
| 197588 ||  || — || April 20, 2004 || Kitt Peak || Spacewatch || APO +1kmPHA || align=right | 1.3 km || 
|-id=589 bgcolor=#fefefe
| 197589 ||  || — || April 20, 2004 || Socorro || LINEAR || FLO || align=right data-sort-value="0.81" | 810 m || 
|-id=590 bgcolor=#fefefe
| 197590 ||  || — || April 16, 2004 || Socorro || LINEAR || — || align=right | 1.6 km || 
|-id=591 bgcolor=#fefefe
| 197591 ||  || — || April 22, 2004 || Socorro || LINEAR || FLO || align=right data-sort-value="0.90" | 900 m || 
|-id=592 bgcolor=#fefefe
| 197592 ||  || — || April 23, 2004 || Socorro || LINEAR || FLO || align=right | 1.3 km || 
|-id=593 bgcolor=#C2FFFF
| 197593 ||  || — || April 20, 2004 || Socorro || LINEAR || L4 || align=right | 18 km || 
|-id=594 bgcolor=#FA8072
| 197594 ||  || — || April 22, 2004 || Campo Imperatore || CINEOS || — || align=right data-sort-value="0.94" | 940 m || 
|-id=595 bgcolor=#FA8072
| 197595 ||  || — || April 25, 2004 || Socorro || LINEAR || — || align=right data-sort-value="0.93" | 930 m || 
|-id=596 bgcolor=#fefefe
| 197596 ||  || — || April 25, 2004 || Socorro || LINEAR || — || align=right | 1.1 km || 
|-id=597 bgcolor=#fefefe
| 197597 ||  || — || April 26, 2004 || Anderson Mesa || LONEOS || — || align=right | 1.4 km || 
|-id=598 bgcolor=#fefefe
| 197598 ||  || — || April 25, 2004 || Kitt Peak || Spacewatch || — || align=right | 1.1 km || 
|-id=599 bgcolor=#fefefe
| 197599 ||  || — || May 9, 2004 || Palomar || NEAT || — || align=right data-sort-value="0.86" | 860 m || 
|-id=600 bgcolor=#fefefe
| 197600 ||  || — || May 9, 2004 || Palomar || NEAT || — || align=right data-sort-value="0.90" | 900 m || 
|}

197601–197700 

|-bgcolor=#fefefe
| 197601 ||  || — || May 9, 2004 || Palomar || NEAT || — || align=right data-sort-value="0.76" | 760 m || 
|-id=602 bgcolor=#fefefe
| 197602 ||  || — || May 11, 2004 || Anderson Mesa || LONEOS || FLO || align=right data-sort-value="0.71" | 710 m || 
|-id=603 bgcolor=#fefefe
| 197603 ||  || — || May 10, 2004 || Kitt Peak || Spacewatch || FLO || align=right data-sort-value="0.67" | 670 m || 
|-id=604 bgcolor=#fefefe
| 197604 ||  || — || May 9, 2004 || Kitt Peak || Spacewatch || — || align=right | 1.2 km || 
|-id=605 bgcolor=#d6d6d6
| 197605 ||  || — || May 10, 2004 || Palomar || NEAT || — || align=right | 4.1 km || 
|-id=606 bgcolor=#fefefe
| 197606 ||  || — || May 11, 2004 || Anderson Mesa || LONEOS || — || align=right | 1.8 km || 
|-id=607 bgcolor=#fefefe
| 197607 ||  || — || May 11, 2004 || Anderson Mesa || LONEOS || FLO || align=right data-sort-value="0.95" | 950 m || 
|-id=608 bgcolor=#fefefe
| 197608 ||  || — || May 11, 2004 || Anderson Mesa || LONEOS || — || align=right data-sort-value="0.83" | 830 m || 
|-id=609 bgcolor=#fefefe
| 197609 ||  || — || May 12, 2004 || Catalina || CSS || FLO || align=right data-sort-value="0.90" | 900 m || 
|-id=610 bgcolor=#fefefe
| 197610 ||  || — || May 13, 2004 || Anderson Mesa || LONEOS || — || align=right | 1.1 km || 
|-id=611 bgcolor=#fefefe
| 197611 ||  || — || May 14, 2004 || Socorro || LINEAR || — || align=right | 1.2 km || 
|-id=612 bgcolor=#fefefe
| 197612 ||  || — || May 14, 2004 || Palomar || NEAT || — || align=right | 1.1 km || 
|-id=613 bgcolor=#fefefe
| 197613 ||  || — || May 14, 2004 || Kitt Peak || Spacewatch || — || align=right data-sort-value="0.99" | 990 m || 
|-id=614 bgcolor=#fefefe
| 197614 ||  || — || May 15, 2004 || Socorro || LINEAR || — || align=right | 1.3 km || 
|-id=615 bgcolor=#FA8072
| 197615 ||  || — || May 15, 2004 || Socorro || LINEAR || — || align=right data-sort-value="0.98" | 980 m || 
|-id=616 bgcolor=#fefefe
| 197616 ||  || — || May 14, 2004 || Kitt Peak || Spacewatch || FLO || align=right data-sort-value="0.70" | 700 m || 
|-id=617 bgcolor=#fefefe
| 197617 ||  || — || May 15, 2004 || Socorro || LINEAR || — || align=right data-sort-value="0.99" | 990 m || 
|-id=618 bgcolor=#fefefe
| 197618 ||  || — || May 15, 2004 || Socorro || LINEAR || — || align=right | 1.5 km || 
|-id=619 bgcolor=#C2FFFF
| 197619 ||  || — || May 13, 2004 || Palomar || NEAT || L4 || align=right | 19 km || 
|-id=620 bgcolor=#C2FFFF
| 197620 ||  || — || May 14, 2004 || Kitt Peak || Spacewatch || L4 || align=right | 18 km || 
|-id=621 bgcolor=#fefefe
| 197621 ||  || — || May 14, 2004 || Kitt Peak || Spacewatch || — || align=right | 1.0 km || 
|-id=622 bgcolor=#fefefe
| 197622 ||  || — || May 14, 2004 || Palomar || NEAT || — || align=right | 1.3 km || 
|-id=623 bgcolor=#fefefe
| 197623 ||  || — || May 15, 2004 || Socorro || LINEAR || — || align=right data-sort-value="0.84" | 840 m || 
|-id=624 bgcolor=#C2FFFF
| 197624 ||  || — || May 9, 2004 || Kitt Peak || Spacewatch || L4 || align=right | 14 km || 
|-id=625 bgcolor=#fefefe
| 197625 ||  || — || May 12, 2004 || Anderson Mesa || LONEOS || — || align=right data-sort-value="0.98" | 980 m || 
|-id=626 bgcolor=#fefefe
| 197626 ||  || — || May 15, 2004 || Socorro || LINEAR || — || align=right | 1.5 km || 
|-id=627 bgcolor=#fefefe
| 197627 || 2004 KO || — || May 16, 2004 || Socorro || LINEAR || — || align=right data-sort-value="0.87" | 870 m || 
|-id=628 bgcolor=#C2FFFF
| 197628 ||  || — || May 16, 2004 || Kitt Peak || Spacewatch || L4 || align=right | 13 km || 
|-id=629 bgcolor=#fefefe
| 197629 ||  || — || May 16, 2004 || Socorro || LINEAR || — || align=right data-sort-value="0.75" | 750 m || 
|-id=630 bgcolor=#C2FFFF
| 197630 ||  || — || May 16, 2004 || Siding Spring || SSS || L4 || align=right | 10 km || 
|-id=631 bgcolor=#fefefe
| 197631 ||  || — || May 18, 2004 || Socorro || LINEAR || — || align=right | 1.2 km || 
|-id=632 bgcolor=#fefefe
| 197632 ||  || — || May 19, 2004 || Socorro || LINEAR || — || align=right | 1.2 km || 
|-id=633 bgcolor=#fefefe
| 197633 ||  || — || May 19, 2004 || Siding Spring || SSS || FLO || align=right | 1.0 km || 
|-id=634 bgcolor=#fefefe
| 197634 ||  || — || May 18, 2004 || Socorro || LINEAR || — || align=right data-sort-value="0.94" | 940 m || 
|-id=635 bgcolor=#fefefe
| 197635 ||  || — || May 20, 2004 || Kitt Peak || Spacewatch || — || align=right data-sort-value="0.99" | 990 m || 
|-id=636 bgcolor=#fefefe
| 197636 ||  || — || May 27, 2004 || Kitt Peak || Spacewatch || MAS || align=right data-sort-value="0.95" | 950 m || 
|-id=637 bgcolor=#fefefe
| 197637 ||  || — || May 16, 2004 || Siding Spring || SSS || — || align=right | 2.0 km || 
|-id=638 bgcolor=#fefefe
| 197638 || 2004 LM || — || June 9, 2004 || Socorro || LINEAR || PHO || align=right | 3.6 km || 
|-id=639 bgcolor=#fefefe
| 197639 ||  || — || June 10, 2004 || Reedy Creek || J. Broughton || — || align=right | 2.0 km || 
|-id=640 bgcolor=#fefefe
| 197640 ||  || — || June 11, 2004 || Anderson Mesa || LONEOS || — || align=right | 1.5 km || 
|-id=641 bgcolor=#fefefe
| 197641 ||  || — || June 11, 2004 || Socorro || LINEAR || — || align=right | 2.1 km || 
|-id=642 bgcolor=#fefefe
| 197642 ||  || — || June 10, 2004 || Campo Imperatore || CINEOS || — || align=right data-sort-value="0.97" | 970 m || 
|-id=643 bgcolor=#fefefe
| 197643 ||  || — || June 12, 2004 || Siding Spring || SSS || — || align=right data-sort-value="0.86" | 860 m || 
|-id=644 bgcolor=#fefefe
| 197644 ||  || — || June 13, 2004 || Palomar || NEAT || — || align=right | 1.5 km || 
|-id=645 bgcolor=#fefefe
| 197645 ||  || — || June 15, 2004 || Socorro || LINEAR || NYS || align=right data-sort-value="0.95" | 950 m || 
|-id=646 bgcolor=#fefefe
| 197646 ||  || — || June 15, 2004 || Socorro || LINEAR || — || align=right | 2.0 km || 
|-id=647 bgcolor=#fefefe
| 197647 ||  || — || June 14, 2004 || Kitt Peak || Spacewatch || — || align=right data-sort-value="0.89" | 890 m || 
|-id=648 bgcolor=#fefefe
| 197648 ||  || — || June 14, 2004 || Kitt Peak || Spacewatch || — || align=right | 1.1 km || 
|-id=649 bgcolor=#fefefe
| 197649 || 2004 MT || — || June 16, 2004 || Socorro || LINEAR || FLO || align=right data-sort-value="0.92" | 920 m || 
|-id=650 bgcolor=#fefefe
| 197650 ||  || — || June 16, 2004 || Socorro || LINEAR || — || align=right | 1.2 km || 
|-id=651 bgcolor=#fefefe
| 197651 ||  || — || June 17, 2004 || Reedy Creek || J. Broughton || — || align=right | 1.3 km || 
|-id=652 bgcolor=#fefefe
| 197652 ||  || — || June 25, 2004 || Reedy Creek || J. Broughton || NYS || align=right data-sort-value="0.92" | 920 m || 
|-id=653 bgcolor=#fefefe
| 197653 ||  || — || June 16, 2004 || Siding Spring || SSS || — || align=right | 2.0 km || 
|-id=654 bgcolor=#fefefe
| 197654 || 2004 NX || — || July 7, 2004 || Campo Imperatore || CINEOS || V || align=right | 1.0 km || 
|-id=655 bgcolor=#fefefe
| 197655 || 2004 NZ || — || July 7, 2004 || Campo Imperatore || CINEOS || — || align=right | 1.0 km || 
|-id=656 bgcolor=#fefefe
| 197656 ||  || — || July 9, 2004 || Palomar || NEAT || FLO || align=right data-sort-value="0.92" | 920 m || 
|-id=657 bgcolor=#fefefe
| 197657 ||  || — || July 9, 2004 || Palomar || NEAT || — || align=right | 1.3 km || 
|-id=658 bgcolor=#fefefe
| 197658 ||  || — || July 9, 2004 || Palomar || NEAT || — || align=right | 1.8 km || 
|-id=659 bgcolor=#fefefe
| 197659 ||  || — || July 9, 2004 || Palomar || NEAT || FLO || align=right | 1.2 km || 
|-id=660 bgcolor=#fefefe
| 197660 ||  || — || July 9, 2004 || Siding Spring || SSS || NYS || align=right | 1.1 km || 
|-id=661 bgcolor=#fefefe
| 197661 ||  || — || July 12, 2004 || Reedy Creek || J. Broughton || — || align=right | 1.2 km || 
|-id=662 bgcolor=#fefefe
| 197662 ||  || — || July 11, 2004 || Socorro || LINEAR || NYS || align=right | 1.0 km || 
|-id=663 bgcolor=#fefefe
| 197663 ||  || — || July 9, 2004 || Socorro || LINEAR || NYS || align=right | 1.0 km || 
|-id=664 bgcolor=#fefefe
| 197664 ||  || — || July 11, 2004 || Socorro || LINEAR || — || align=right | 1.3 km || 
|-id=665 bgcolor=#fefefe
| 197665 ||  || — || July 11, 2004 || Socorro || LINEAR || FLO || align=right data-sort-value="0.98" | 980 m || 
|-id=666 bgcolor=#fefefe
| 197666 ||  || — || July 11, 2004 || Socorro || LINEAR || — || align=right | 1.4 km || 
|-id=667 bgcolor=#fefefe
| 197667 ||  || — || July 9, 2004 || Socorro || LINEAR || — || align=right | 1.6 km || 
|-id=668 bgcolor=#fefefe
| 197668 ||  || — || July 11, 2004 || Socorro || LINEAR || — || align=right | 1.2 km || 
|-id=669 bgcolor=#fefefe
| 197669 ||  || — || July 11, 2004 || Socorro || LINEAR || — || align=right | 1.2 km || 
|-id=670 bgcolor=#fefefe
| 197670 ||  || — || July 11, 2004 || Socorro || LINEAR || — || align=right data-sort-value="0.99" | 990 m || 
|-id=671 bgcolor=#fefefe
| 197671 ||  || — || July 11, 2004 || Socorro || LINEAR || — || align=right | 1.1 km || 
|-id=672 bgcolor=#fefefe
| 197672 ||  || — || July 11, 2004 || Socorro || LINEAR || — || align=right | 3.1 km || 
|-id=673 bgcolor=#fefefe
| 197673 ||  || — || July 11, 2004 || Socorro || LINEAR || NYS || align=right data-sort-value="0.95" | 950 m || 
|-id=674 bgcolor=#fefefe
| 197674 ||  || — || July 11, 2004 || Socorro || LINEAR || NYS || align=right data-sort-value="0.98" | 980 m || 
|-id=675 bgcolor=#fefefe
| 197675 ||  || — || July 11, 2004 || Socorro || LINEAR || NYS || align=right data-sort-value="0.77" | 770 m || 
|-id=676 bgcolor=#fefefe
| 197676 ||  || — || July 14, 2004 || Socorro || LINEAR || ERI || align=right | 2.5 km || 
|-id=677 bgcolor=#fefefe
| 197677 ||  || — || July 14, 2004 || Socorro || LINEAR || V || align=right | 1.1 km || 
|-id=678 bgcolor=#fefefe
| 197678 ||  || — || July 15, 2004 || Socorro || LINEAR || ERI || align=right | 2.8 km || 
|-id=679 bgcolor=#fefefe
| 197679 ||  || — || July 14, 2004 || Socorro || LINEAR || — || align=right | 2.8 km || 
|-id=680 bgcolor=#fefefe
| 197680 ||  || — || July 14, 2004 || Socorro || LINEAR || — || align=right | 1.6 km || 
|-id=681 bgcolor=#fefefe
| 197681 ||  || — || July 14, 2004 || Socorro || LINEAR || — || align=right | 1.3 km || 
|-id=682 bgcolor=#fefefe
| 197682 ||  || — || July 11, 2004 || Socorro || LINEAR || — || align=right | 1.1 km || 
|-id=683 bgcolor=#fefefe
| 197683 ||  || — || July 11, 2004 || Socorro || LINEAR || NYS || align=right data-sort-value="0.86" | 860 m || 
|-id=684 bgcolor=#fefefe
| 197684 ||  || — || July 11, 2004 || Socorro || LINEAR || ERI || align=right | 2.2 km || 
|-id=685 bgcolor=#fefefe
| 197685 ||  || — || July 11, 2004 || Socorro || LINEAR || — || align=right | 1.4 km || 
|-id=686 bgcolor=#fefefe
| 197686 ||  || — || July 11, 2004 || Socorro || LINEAR || — || align=right data-sort-value="0.93" | 930 m || 
|-id=687 bgcolor=#fefefe
| 197687 ||  || — || July 14, 2004 || Socorro || LINEAR || — || align=right | 1.4 km || 
|-id=688 bgcolor=#fefefe
| 197688 ||  || — || July 9, 2004 || Anderson Mesa || LONEOS || — || align=right | 1.4 km || 
|-id=689 bgcolor=#fefefe
| 197689 ||  || — || July 3, 2004 || Anderson Mesa || LONEOS || — || align=right | 2.2 km || 
|-id=690 bgcolor=#fefefe
| 197690 ||  || — || July 16, 2004 || Socorro || LINEAR || NYS || align=right data-sort-value="0.94" | 940 m || 
|-id=691 bgcolor=#fefefe
| 197691 ||  || — || July 16, 2004 || Socorro || LINEAR || NYS || align=right data-sort-value="0.98" | 980 m || 
|-id=692 bgcolor=#fefefe
| 197692 ||  || — || July 16, 2004 || Socorro || LINEAR || FLO || align=right data-sort-value="0.97" | 970 m || 
|-id=693 bgcolor=#fefefe
| 197693 ||  || — || July 17, 2004 || Reedy Creek || J. Broughton || ERI || align=right | 3.5 km || 
|-id=694 bgcolor=#fefefe
| 197694 ||  || — || July 16, 2004 || Socorro || LINEAR || NYS || align=right data-sort-value="0.86" | 860 m || 
|-id=695 bgcolor=#fefefe
| 197695 ||  || — || July 16, 2004 || Socorro || LINEAR || — || align=right | 1.1 km || 
|-id=696 bgcolor=#fefefe
| 197696 ||  || — || July 16, 2004 || Socorro || LINEAR || MAS || align=right | 1.3 km || 
|-id=697 bgcolor=#fefefe
| 197697 ||  || — || July 16, 2004 || Socorro || LINEAR || — || align=right | 1.2 km || 
|-id=698 bgcolor=#fefefe
| 197698 ||  || — || July 16, 2004 || Socorro || LINEAR || — || align=right | 1.3 km || 
|-id=699 bgcolor=#fefefe
| 197699 ||  || — || July 16, 2004 || Socorro || LINEAR || — || align=right | 1.5 km || 
|-id=700 bgcolor=#fefefe
| 197700 ||  || — || July 16, 2004 || Socorro || LINEAR || — || align=right data-sort-value="0.90" | 900 m || 
|}

197701–197800 

|-bgcolor=#fefefe
| 197701 ||  || — || July 17, 2004 || Socorro || LINEAR || — || align=right | 1.3 km || 
|-id=702 bgcolor=#fefefe
| 197702 ||  || — || July 19, 2004 || Anderson Mesa || LONEOS || NYS || align=right | 1.0 km || 
|-id=703 bgcolor=#fefefe
| 197703 ||  || — || July 19, 2004 || Reedy Creek || J. Broughton || — || align=right data-sort-value="0.90" | 900 m || 
|-id=704 bgcolor=#fefefe
| 197704 ||  || — || July 20, 2004 || Reedy Creek || J. Broughton || — || align=right | 1.8 km || 
|-id=705 bgcolor=#fefefe
| 197705 ||  || — || July 27, 2004 || Socorro || LINEAR || V || align=right | 1.3 km || 
|-id=706 bgcolor=#fefefe
| 197706 || 2004 PH || — || August 5, 2004 || Palomar || NEAT || — || align=right | 1.2 km || 
|-id=707 bgcolor=#fefefe
| 197707 Paulnohr || 2004 PN ||  || August 5, 2004 || Palomar || NEAT || — || align=right | 1.2 km || 
|-id=708 bgcolor=#fefefe
| 197708 Kalipona ||  ||  || August 8, 2004 || Needville || J. Dellinger || NYS || align=right data-sort-value="0.93" | 930 m || 
|-id=709 bgcolor=#fefefe
| 197709 ||  || — || August 6, 2004 || Reedy Creek || J. Broughton || — || align=right | 1.2 km || 
|-id=710 bgcolor=#FA8072
| 197710 ||  || — || August 8, 2004 || Socorro || LINEAR || — || align=right | 1.8 km || 
|-id=711 bgcolor=#fefefe
| 197711 ||  || — || August 3, 2004 || Siding Spring || SSS || NYS || align=right | 1.1 km || 
|-id=712 bgcolor=#fefefe
| 197712 ||  || — || August 3, 2004 || Siding Spring || SSS || V || align=right | 1.1 km || 
|-id=713 bgcolor=#fefefe
| 197713 ||  || — || August 3, 2004 || Siding Spring || SSS || — || align=right data-sort-value="0.97" | 970 m || 
|-id=714 bgcolor=#fefefe
| 197714 ||  || — || August 5, 2004 || Palomar || NEAT || — || align=right | 1.3 km || 
|-id=715 bgcolor=#fefefe
| 197715 ||  || — || August 6, 2004 || Palomar || NEAT || NYS || align=right | 1.2 km || 
|-id=716 bgcolor=#fefefe
| 197716 ||  || — || August 6, 2004 || Palomar || NEAT || ERI || align=right | 2.2 km || 
|-id=717 bgcolor=#fefefe
| 197717 ||  || — || August 6, 2004 || Palomar || NEAT || V || align=right | 1.0 km || 
|-id=718 bgcolor=#fefefe
| 197718 ||  || — || August 6, 2004 || Palomar || NEAT || NYS || align=right | 1.1 km || 
|-id=719 bgcolor=#fefefe
| 197719 ||  || — || August 6, 2004 || Palomar || NEAT || — || align=right | 1.4 km || 
|-id=720 bgcolor=#fefefe
| 197720 ||  || — || August 7, 2004 || Palomar || NEAT || — || align=right | 1.2 km || 
|-id=721 bgcolor=#fefefe
| 197721 ||  || — || August 7, 2004 || Palomar || NEAT || NYS || align=right data-sort-value="0.91" | 910 m || 
|-id=722 bgcolor=#fefefe
| 197722 ||  || — || August 7, 2004 || Palomar || NEAT || NYS || align=right data-sort-value="0.97" | 970 m || 
|-id=723 bgcolor=#fefefe
| 197723 ||  || — || August 7, 2004 || Palomar || NEAT || V || align=right | 1.2 km || 
|-id=724 bgcolor=#fefefe
| 197724 ||  || — || August 7, 2004 || Palomar || NEAT || — || align=right | 1.2 km || 
|-id=725 bgcolor=#fefefe
| 197725 ||  || — || August 8, 2004 || Campo Imperatore || CINEOS || — || align=right | 1.4 km || 
|-id=726 bgcolor=#fefefe
| 197726 ||  || — || August 8, 2004 || Socorro || LINEAR || NYS || align=right data-sort-value="0.86" | 860 m || 
|-id=727 bgcolor=#fefefe
| 197727 ||  || — || August 8, 2004 || Socorro || LINEAR || — || align=right | 2.6 km || 
|-id=728 bgcolor=#fefefe
| 197728 ||  || — || August 8, 2004 || Anderson Mesa || LONEOS || MAS || align=right | 1.2 km || 
|-id=729 bgcolor=#fefefe
| 197729 ||  || — || August 8, 2004 || Anderson Mesa || LONEOS || MAS || align=right | 1.3 km || 
|-id=730 bgcolor=#fefefe
| 197730 ||  || — || August 8, 2004 || Anderson Mesa || LONEOS || NYS || align=right data-sort-value="0.90" | 900 m || 
|-id=731 bgcolor=#fefefe
| 197731 ||  || — || August 8, 2004 || Anderson Mesa || LONEOS || — || align=right | 2.2 km || 
|-id=732 bgcolor=#fefefe
| 197732 ||  || — || August 7, 2004 || Palomar || NEAT || — || align=right | 1.3 km || 
|-id=733 bgcolor=#fefefe
| 197733 ||  || — || August 8, 2004 || Socorro || LINEAR || MAS || align=right data-sort-value="0.93" | 930 m || 
|-id=734 bgcolor=#fefefe
| 197734 ||  || — || August 8, 2004 || Socorro || LINEAR || MAS || align=right | 1.1 km || 
|-id=735 bgcolor=#fefefe
| 197735 ||  || — || August 8, 2004 || Socorro || LINEAR || MAS || align=right | 1.6 km || 
|-id=736 bgcolor=#fefefe
| 197736 ||  || — || August 8, 2004 || Socorro || LINEAR || NYS || align=right data-sort-value="0.82" | 820 m || 
|-id=737 bgcolor=#fefefe
| 197737 ||  || — || August 8, 2004 || Socorro || LINEAR || — || align=right | 1.2 km || 
|-id=738 bgcolor=#fefefe
| 197738 ||  || — || August 8, 2004 || Socorro || LINEAR || — || align=right | 1.6 km || 
|-id=739 bgcolor=#fefefe
| 197739 ||  || — || August 8, 2004 || Socorro || LINEAR || NYS || align=right data-sort-value="0.97" | 970 m || 
|-id=740 bgcolor=#fefefe
| 197740 ||  || — || August 8, 2004 || Socorro || LINEAR || EUT || align=right | 1.1 km || 
|-id=741 bgcolor=#fefefe
| 197741 ||  || — || August 8, 2004 || Socorro || LINEAR || EUT || align=right | 1.1 km || 
|-id=742 bgcolor=#fefefe
| 197742 ||  || — || August 8, 2004 || Reedy Creek || J. Broughton || — || align=right | 1.4 km || 
|-id=743 bgcolor=#fefefe
| 197743 ||  || — || August 9, 2004 || Reedy Creek || J. Broughton || — || align=right | 1.5 km || 
|-id=744 bgcolor=#fefefe
| 197744 ||  || — || August 5, 2004 || Palomar || NEAT || V || align=right data-sort-value="0.94" | 940 m || 
|-id=745 bgcolor=#fefefe
| 197745 ||  || — || August 7, 2004 || Palomar || NEAT || NYS || align=right data-sort-value="0.83" | 830 m || 
|-id=746 bgcolor=#fefefe
| 197746 ||  || — || August 8, 2004 || Socorro || LINEAR || Vfast? || align=right | 1.1 km || 
|-id=747 bgcolor=#fefefe
| 197747 ||  || — || August 8, 2004 || Socorro || LINEAR || — || align=right data-sort-value="0.91" | 910 m || 
|-id=748 bgcolor=#fefefe
| 197748 ||  || — || August 8, 2004 || Socorro || LINEAR || MAS || align=right | 1.1 km || 
|-id=749 bgcolor=#fefefe
| 197749 ||  || — || August 8, 2004 || Socorro || LINEAR || — || align=right | 1.6 km || 
|-id=750 bgcolor=#fefefe
| 197750 ||  || — || August 8, 2004 || Socorro || LINEAR || MAS || align=right | 1.3 km || 
|-id=751 bgcolor=#fefefe
| 197751 ||  || — || August 8, 2004 || Socorro || LINEAR || — || align=right | 1.3 km || 
|-id=752 bgcolor=#fefefe
| 197752 ||  || — || August 8, 2004 || Socorro || LINEAR || MAS || align=right | 1.0 km || 
|-id=753 bgcolor=#fefefe
| 197753 ||  || — || August 8, 2004 || Socorro || LINEAR || — || align=right | 1.3 km || 
|-id=754 bgcolor=#fefefe
| 197754 ||  || — || August 8, 2004 || Anderson Mesa || LONEOS || MAS || align=right data-sort-value="0.92" | 920 m || 
|-id=755 bgcolor=#fefefe
| 197755 ||  || — || August 8, 2004 || Anderson Mesa || LONEOS || ERI || align=right | 2.7 km || 
|-id=756 bgcolor=#fefefe
| 197756 ||  || — || August 8, 2004 || Anderson Mesa || LONEOS || NYS || align=right data-sort-value="0.96" | 960 m || 
|-id=757 bgcolor=#fefefe
| 197757 ||  || — || August 8, 2004 || Anderson Mesa || LONEOS || — || align=right | 1.3 km || 
|-id=758 bgcolor=#fefefe
| 197758 ||  || — || August 8, 2004 || Anderson Mesa || LONEOS || — || align=right | 1.3 km || 
|-id=759 bgcolor=#fefefe
| 197759 ||  || — || August 8, 2004 || Anderson Mesa || LONEOS || — || align=right | 1.0 km || 
|-id=760 bgcolor=#fefefe
| 197760 ||  || — || August 8, 2004 || Anderson Mesa || LONEOS || MAS || align=right | 1.1 km || 
|-id=761 bgcolor=#fefefe
| 197761 ||  || — || August 8, 2004 || Anderson Mesa || LONEOS || NYS || align=right data-sort-value="0.96" | 960 m || 
|-id=762 bgcolor=#fefefe
| 197762 ||  || — || August 8, 2004 || Anderson Mesa || LONEOS || — || align=right | 1.3 km || 
|-id=763 bgcolor=#fefefe
| 197763 ||  || — || August 8, 2004 || Anderson Mesa || LONEOS || NYS || align=right data-sort-value="0.98" | 980 m || 
|-id=764 bgcolor=#fefefe
| 197764 ||  || — || August 8, 2004 || Anderson Mesa || LONEOS || FLO || align=right | 1.0 km || 
|-id=765 bgcolor=#fefefe
| 197765 ||  || — || August 9, 2004 || Socorro || LINEAR || — || align=right | 1.2 km || 
|-id=766 bgcolor=#fefefe
| 197766 ||  || — || August 9, 2004 || Socorro || LINEAR || — || align=right | 1.5 km || 
|-id=767 bgcolor=#fefefe
| 197767 ||  || — || August 9, 2004 || Anderson Mesa || LONEOS || — || align=right | 1.0 km || 
|-id=768 bgcolor=#fefefe
| 197768 ||  || — || August 9, 2004 || Anderson Mesa || LONEOS || — || align=right | 1.2 km || 
|-id=769 bgcolor=#fefefe
| 197769 ||  || — || August 9, 2004 || Socorro || LINEAR || — || align=right | 1.4 km || 
|-id=770 bgcolor=#fefefe
| 197770 ||  || — || August 9, 2004 || Socorro || LINEAR || — || align=right | 1.7 km || 
|-id=771 bgcolor=#fefefe
| 197771 ||  || — || August 9, 2004 || Socorro || LINEAR || — || align=right | 1.1 km || 
|-id=772 bgcolor=#fefefe
| 197772 ||  || — || August 7, 2004 || Palomar || NEAT || V || align=right data-sort-value="0.83" | 830 m || 
|-id=773 bgcolor=#fefefe
| 197773 ||  || — || August 7, 2004 || Palomar || NEAT || NYS || align=right | 1.2 km || 
|-id=774 bgcolor=#fefefe
| 197774 ||  || — || August 7, 2004 || Palomar || NEAT || — || align=right | 1.4 km || 
|-id=775 bgcolor=#fefefe
| 197775 ||  || — || August 7, 2004 || Palomar || NEAT || V || align=right data-sort-value="0.92" | 920 m || 
|-id=776 bgcolor=#fefefe
| 197776 ||  || — || August 7, 2004 || Palomar || NEAT || — || align=right | 1.1 km || 
|-id=777 bgcolor=#fefefe
| 197777 ||  || — || August 7, 2004 || Siding Spring || SSS || V || align=right data-sort-value="0.87" | 870 m || 
|-id=778 bgcolor=#fefefe
| 197778 ||  || — || August 7, 2004 || Campo Imperatore || CINEOS || V || align=right data-sort-value="0.92" | 920 m || 
|-id=779 bgcolor=#fefefe
| 197779 ||  || — || August 7, 2004 || Campo Imperatore || CINEOS || — || align=right data-sort-value="0.97" | 970 m || 
|-id=780 bgcolor=#fefefe
| 197780 ||  || — || August 8, 2004 || Campo Imperatore || CINEOS || — || align=right | 1.2 km || 
|-id=781 bgcolor=#fefefe
| 197781 ||  || — || August 8, 2004 || Socorro || LINEAR || — || align=right | 1.3 km || 
|-id=782 bgcolor=#fefefe
| 197782 ||  || — || August 8, 2004 || Socorro || LINEAR || NYS || align=right data-sort-value="0.88" | 880 m || 
|-id=783 bgcolor=#fefefe
| 197783 ||  || — || August 8, 2004 || Socorro || LINEAR || V || align=right | 1.1 km || 
|-id=784 bgcolor=#fefefe
| 197784 ||  || — || August 8, 2004 || Socorro || LINEAR || — || align=right | 1.4 km || 
|-id=785 bgcolor=#fefefe
| 197785 ||  || — || August 8, 2004 || Socorro || LINEAR || — || align=right | 1.4 km || 
|-id=786 bgcolor=#fefefe
| 197786 ||  || — || August 8, 2004 || Socorro || LINEAR || — || align=right | 1.1 km || 
|-id=787 bgcolor=#fefefe
| 197787 ||  || — || August 8, 2004 || Socorro || LINEAR || NYS || align=right | 1.1 km || 
|-id=788 bgcolor=#fefefe
| 197788 ||  || — || August 8, 2004 || Socorro || LINEAR || — || align=right | 1.4 km || 
|-id=789 bgcolor=#fefefe
| 197789 ||  || — || August 8, 2004 || Socorro || LINEAR || — || align=right | 1.1 km || 
|-id=790 bgcolor=#fefefe
| 197790 ||  || — || August 8, 2004 || Anderson Mesa || LONEOS || — || align=right | 1.5 km || 
|-id=791 bgcolor=#fefefe
| 197791 ||  || — || August 8, 2004 || Anderson Mesa || LONEOS || V || align=right | 1.1 km || 
|-id=792 bgcolor=#fefefe
| 197792 ||  || — || August 9, 2004 || Socorro || LINEAR || — || align=right | 3.6 km || 
|-id=793 bgcolor=#fefefe
| 197793 ||  || — || August 9, 2004 || Socorro || LINEAR || — || align=right | 1.3 km || 
|-id=794 bgcolor=#fefefe
| 197794 ||  || — || August 9, 2004 || Socorro || LINEAR || V || align=right | 1.1 km || 
|-id=795 bgcolor=#fefefe
| 197795 ||  || — || August 9, 2004 || Anderson Mesa || LONEOS || — || align=right | 1.5 km || 
|-id=796 bgcolor=#fefefe
| 197796 ||  || — || August 9, 2004 || Anderson Mesa || LONEOS || NYS || align=right | 1.1 km || 
|-id=797 bgcolor=#fefefe
| 197797 ||  || — || August 9, 2004 || Anderson Mesa || LONEOS || — || align=right | 1.1 km || 
|-id=798 bgcolor=#fefefe
| 197798 ||  || — || August 9, 2004 || Socorro || LINEAR || — || align=right | 1.7 km || 
|-id=799 bgcolor=#fefefe
| 197799 ||  || — || August 10, 2004 || Socorro || LINEAR || V || align=right data-sort-value="0.95" | 950 m || 
|-id=800 bgcolor=#fefefe
| 197800 ||  || — || August 10, 2004 || Socorro || LINEAR || — || align=right | 1.2 km || 
|}

197801–197900 

|-bgcolor=#fefefe
| 197801 ||  || — || August 10, 2004 || Siding Spring || SSS || — || align=right | 1.1 km || 
|-id=802 bgcolor=#fefefe
| 197802 ||  || — || August 10, 2004 || Socorro || LINEAR || MAS || align=right | 1.1 km || 
|-id=803 bgcolor=#fefefe
| 197803 ||  || — || August 5, 2004 || Palomar || NEAT || — || align=right | 1.2 km || 
|-id=804 bgcolor=#fefefe
| 197804 ||  || — || August 6, 2004 || Palomar || NEAT || V || align=right | 1.0 km || 
|-id=805 bgcolor=#fefefe
| 197805 ||  || — || August 7, 2004 || Palomar || NEAT || NYS || align=right data-sort-value="0.95" | 950 m || 
|-id=806 bgcolor=#fefefe
| 197806 ||  || — || August 7, 2004 || Palomar || NEAT || — || align=right | 1.2 km || 
|-id=807 bgcolor=#fefefe
| 197807 ||  || — || August 7, 2004 || Palomar || NEAT || — || align=right | 1.2 km || 
|-id=808 bgcolor=#fefefe
| 197808 ||  || — || August 8, 2004 || Campo Imperatore || CINEOS || MAS || align=right data-sort-value="0.98" | 980 m || 
|-id=809 bgcolor=#fefefe
| 197809 ||  || — || August 8, 2004 || Socorro || LINEAR || MAS || align=right data-sort-value="0.97" | 970 m || 
|-id=810 bgcolor=#fefefe
| 197810 ||  || — || August 8, 2004 || Socorro || LINEAR || MAS || align=right data-sort-value="0.96" | 960 m || 
|-id=811 bgcolor=#fefefe
| 197811 ||  || — || August 8, 2004 || Socorro || LINEAR || ERI || align=right | 2.8 km || 
|-id=812 bgcolor=#fefefe
| 197812 ||  || — || August 8, 2004 || Socorro || LINEAR || — || align=right | 1.1 km || 
|-id=813 bgcolor=#fefefe
| 197813 ||  || — || August 8, 2004 || Socorro || LINEAR || NYS || align=right | 1.1 km || 
|-id=814 bgcolor=#fefefe
| 197814 ||  || — || August 8, 2004 || Socorro || LINEAR || NYS || align=right | 1.0 km || 
|-id=815 bgcolor=#fefefe
| 197815 ||  || — || August 8, 2004 || Anderson Mesa || LONEOS || — || align=right | 1.3 km || 
|-id=816 bgcolor=#fefefe
| 197816 ||  || — || August 9, 2004 || Anderson Mesa || LONEOS || FLO || align=right data-sort-value="0.91" | 910 m || 
|-id=817 bgcolor=#fefefe
| 197817 ||  || — || August 9, 2004 || Socorro || LINEAR || V || align=right data-sort-value="0.89" | 890 m || 
|-id=818 bgcolor=#fefefe
| 197818 ||  || — || August 9, 2004 || Socorro || LINEAR || FLO || align=right | 1.0 km || 
|-id=819 bgcolor=#fefefe
| 197819 ||  || — || August 9, 2004 || Socorro || LINEAR || — || align=right | 1.0 km || 
|-id=820 bgcolor=#fefefe
| 197820 ||  || — || August 9, 2004 || Socorro || LINEAR || — || align=right | 1.4 km || 
|-id=821 bgcolor=#fefefe
| 197821 ||  || — || August 9, 2004 || Anderson Mesa || LONEOS || NYS || align=right | 1.0 km || 
|-id=822 bgcolor=#E9E9E9
| 197822 ||  || — || August 9, 2004 || Socorro || LINEAR || — || align=right | 2.2 km || 
|-id=823 bgcolor=#E9E9E9
| 197823 ||  || — || August 10, 2004 || Socorro || LINEAR || — || align=right | 1.2 km || 
|-id=824 bgcolor=#fefefe
| 197824 ||  || — || August 10, 2004 || Socorro || LINEAR || V || align=right | 1.1 km || 
|-id=825 bgcolor=#fefefe
| 197825 ||  || — || August 10, 2004 || Socorro || LINEAR || MAS || align=right data-sort-value="0.88" | 880 m || 
|-id=826 bgcolor=#E9E9E9
| 197826 ||  || — || August 10, 2004 || Socorro || LINEAR || — || align=right | 4.5 km || 
|-id=827 bgcolor=#fefefe
| 197827 ||  || — || August 8, 2004 || Palomar || NEAT || — || align=right data-sort-value="0.98" | 980 m || 
|-id=828 bgcolor=#fefefe
| 197828 ||  || — || August 11, 2004 || Socorro || LINEAR || NYS || align=right data-sort-value="0.83" | 830 m || 
|-id=829 bgcolor=#fefefe
| 197829 ||  || — || August 12, 2004 || Socorro || LINEAR || — || align=right | 1.3 km || 
|-id=830 bgcolor=#fefefe
| 197830 ||  || — || August 12, 2004 || Socorro || LINEAR || V || align=right data-sort-value="0.88" | 880 m || 
|-id=831 bgcolor=#fefefe
| 197831 ||  || — || August 10, 2004 || Campo Imperatore || CINEOS || NYS || align=right data-sort-value="0.89" | 890 m || 
|-id=832 bgcolor=#fefefe
| 197832 ||  || — || August 11, 2004 || Socorro || LINEAR || — || align=right data-sort-value="0.88" | 880 m || 
|-id=833 bgcolor=#fefefe
| 197833 ||  || — || August 12, 2004 || Socorro || LINEAR || — || align=right | 1.2 km || 
|-id=834 bgcolor=#fefefe
| 197834 ||  || — || August 13, 2004 || Reedy Creek || J. Broughton || — || align=right | 1.8 km || 
|-id=835 bgcolor=#fefefe
| 197835 ||  || — || August 10, 2004 || Socorro || LINEAR || NYS || align=right data-sort-value="0.86" | 860 m || 
|-id=836 bgcolor=#fefefe
| 197836 ||  || — || August 11, 2004 || Socorro || LINEAR || NYS || align=right | 1.1 km || 
|-id=837 bgcolor=#fefefe
| 197837 ||  || — || August 8, 2004 || Socorro || LINEAR || — || align=right | 1.3 km || 
|-id=838 bgcolor=#E9E9E9
| 197838 ||  || — || August 9, 2004 || Socorro || LINEAR || — || align=right | 2.5 km || 
|-id=839 bgcolor=#E9E9E9
| 197839 ||  || — || August 10, 2004 || Palomar || NEAT || — || align=right | 4.2 km || 
|-id=840 bgcolor=#fefefe
| 197840 ||  || — || August 11, 2004 || Socorro || LINEAR || NYS || align=right | 1.2 km || 
|-id=841 bgcolor=#fefefe
| 197841 ||  || — || August 13, 2004 || Palomar || NEAT || V || align=right data-sort-value="0.88" | 880 m || 
|-id=842 bgcolor=#fefefe
| 197842 ||  || — || August 15, 2004 || Palomar || NEAT || — || align=right | 1.5 km || 
|-id=843 bgcolor=#fefefe
| 197843 ||  || — || August 12, 2004 || Campo Imperatore || CINEOS || — || align=right | 2.3 km || 
|-id=844 bgcolor=#fefefe
| 197844 ||  || — || August 12, 2004 || Socorro || LINEAR || — || align=right | 1.0 km || 
|-id=845 bgcolor=#fefefe
| 197845 Michaelvincent ||  ||  || August 14, 2004 || Cerro Tololo || M. W. Buie || — || align=right | 1.1 km || 
|-id=846 bgcolor=#fefefe
| 197846 ||  || — || August 8, 2004 || Palomar || NEAT || — || align=right | 1.4 km || 
|-id=847 bgcolor=#fefefe
| 197847 ||  || — || August 19, 2004 || Reedy Creek || J. Broughton || — || align=right | 1.4 km || 
|-id=848 bgcolor=#fefefe
| 197848 ||  || — || August 20, 2004 || Kitt Peak || Spacewatch || — || align=right | 1.1 km || 
|-id=849 bgcolor=#fefefe
| 197849 ||  || — || August 20, 2004 || Reedy Creek || J. Broughton || — || align=right | 1.4 km || 
|-id=850 bgcolor=#fefefe
| 197850 ||  || — || August 21, 2004 || Reedy Creek || J. Broughton || — || align=right | 2.0 km || 
|-id=851 bgcolor=#fefefe
| 197851 ||  || — || August 21, 2004 || Reedy Creek || J. Broughton || V || align=right | 1.2 km || 
|-id=852 bgcolor=#fefefe
| 197852 ||  || — || August 21, 2004 || Reedy Creek || J. Broughton || — || align=right | 1.0 km || 
|-id=853 bgcolor=#fefefe
| 197853 ||  || — || August 22, 2004 || Reedy Creek || J. Broughton || — || align=right | 1.2 km || 
|-id=854 bgcolor=#fefefe
| 197854 ||  || — || August 21, 2004 || Siding Spring || SSS || — || align=right | 1.4 km || 
|-id=855 bgcolor=#fefefe
| 197855 ||  || — || August 21, 2004 || Siding Spring || SSS || — || align=right | 1.5 km || 
|-id=856 bgcolor=#fefefe
| 197856 Tafelmusik ||  ||  || August 21, 2004 || Mauna Kea || D. D. Balam || — || align=right | 1.3 km || 
|-id=857 bgcolor=#fefefe
| 197857 ||  || — || August 21, 2004 || Catalina || CSS || NYS || align=right | 1.0 km || 
|-id=858 bgcolor=#fefefe
| 197858 ||  || — || August 25, 2004 || Kitt Peak || Spacewatch || — || align=right | 1.6 km || 
|-id=859 bgcolor=#fefefe
| 197859 ||  || — || August 25, 2004 || Socorro || LINEAR || PHO || align=right | 3.2 km || 
|-id=860 bgcolor=#E9E9E9
| 197860 ||  || — || August 26, 2004 || Anderson Mesa || LONEOS || HNS || align=right | 2.6 km || 
|-id=861 bgcolor=#fefefe
| 197861 ||  || — || August 26, 2004 || Siding Spring || SSS || — || align=right | 1.4 km || 
|-id=862 bgcolor=#fefefe
| 197862 ||  || — || September 4, 2004 || Needville || Needville Obs. || NYS || align=right data-sort-value="0.93" | 930 m || 
|-id=863 bgcolor=#fefefe
| 197863 ||  || — || September 3, 2004 || Palomar || NEAT || — || align=right | 1.8 km || 
|-id=864 bgcolor=#fefefe
| 197864 Florentpagny ||  ||  || September 5, 2004 || Vicques || M. Ory || — || align=right | 2.8 km || 
|-id=865 bgcolor=#fefefe
| 197865 ||  || — || September 4, 2004 || Palomar || NEAT || — || align=right | 1.4 km || 
|-id=866 bgcolor=#fefefe
| 197866 ||  || — || September 4, 2004 || Palomar || NEAT || V || align=right | 1.0 km || 
|-id=867 bgcolor=#fefefe
| 197867 ||  || — || September 4, 2004 || Palomar || NEAT || V || align=right data-sort-value="0.93" | 930 m || 
|-id=868 bgcolor=#fefefe
| 197868 ||  || — || September 5, 2004 || Palomar || NEAT || — || align=right | 1.7 km || 
|-id=869 bgcolor=#E9E9E9
| 197869 ||  || — || September 6, 2004 || Saint-Véran || Saint-Véran Obs. || — || align=right | 4.1 km || 
|-id=870 bgcolor=#E9E9E9
| 197870 Erkman ||  ||  || September 6, 2004 || Vicques || M. Ory || EUN || align=right | 1.9 km || 
|-id=871 bgcolor=#E9E9E9
| 197871 ||  || — || September 6, 2004 || Kleť || M. Tichý || — || align=right | 1.1 km || 
|-id=872 bgcolor=#fefefe
| 197872 ||  || — || September 6, 2004 || Ottmarsheim || C. Rinner || — || align=right | 1.4 km || 
|-id=873 bgcolor=#fefefe
| 197873 ||  || — || September 6, 2004 || Goodricke-Pigott || Goodricke-Pigott Obs. || — || align=right | 1.1 km || 
|-id=874 bgcolor=#E9E9E9
| 197874 ||  || — || September 6, 2004 || Siding Spring || SSS || — || align=right | 2.0 km || 
|-id=875 bgcolor=#fefefe
| 197875 ||  || — || September 6, 2004 || Needville || Needville Obs. || NYS || align=right data-sort-value="0.77" | 770 m || 
|-id=876 bgcolor=#fefefe
| 197876 ||  || — || September 6, 2004 || Needville || Needville Obs. || MAS || align=right data-sort-value="0.86" | 860 m || 
|-id=877 bgcolor=#fefefe
| 197877 ||  || — || September 6, 2004 || Siding Spring || SSS || — || align=right data-sort-value="0.83" | 830 m || 
|-id=878 bgcolor=#E9E9E9
| 197878 ||  || — || September 6, 2004 || Siding Spring || SSS || KON || align=right | 4.2 km || 
|-id=879 bgcolor=#fefefe
| 197879 ||  || — || September 6, 2004 || Siding Spring || SSS || — || align=right | 1.2 km || 
|-id=880 bgcolor=#fefefe
| 197880 ||  || — || September 7, 2004 || Socorro || LINEAR || MAS || align=right data-sort-value="0.95" | 950 m || 
|-id=881 bgcolor=#fefefe
| 197881 ||  || — || September 7, 2004 || Socorro || LINEAR || NYS || align=right data-sort-value="0.82" | 820 m || 
|-id=882 bgcolor=#fefefe
| 197882 ||  || — || September 7, 2004 || Socorro || LINEAR || NYS || align=right | 1.0 km || 
|-id=883 bgcolor=#fefefe
| 197883 ||  || — || September 7, 2004 || Socorro || LINEAR || — || align=right | 1.1 km || 
|-id=884 bgcolor=#fefefe
| 197884 ||  || — || September 7, 2004 || Kitt Peak || Spacewatch || — || align=right | 1.2 km || 
|-id=885 bgcolor=#fefefe
| 197885 ||  || — || September 7, 2004 || Kitt Peak || Spacewatch || MAS || align=right | 1.0 km || 
|-id=886 bgcolor=#fefefe
| 197886 ||  || — || September 7, 2004 || Kitt Peak || Spacewatch || MAS || align=right data-sort-value="0.87" | 870 m || 
|-id=887 bgcolor=#E9E9E9
| 197887 ||  || — || September 7, 2004 || Kitt Peak || Spacewatch || — || align=right | 1.2 km || 
|-id=888 bgcolor=#fefefe
| 197888 ||  || — || September 7, 2004 || Kitt Peak || Spacewatch || — || align=right | 1.1 km || 
|-id=889 bgcolor=#fefefe
| 197889 ||  || — || September 7, 2004 || Kitt Peak || Spacewatch || — || align=right | 1.2 km || 
|-id=890 bgcolor=#fefefe
| 197890 ||  || — || September 7, 2004 || Kitt Peak || Spacewatch || NYS || align=right data-sort-value="0.96" | 960 m || 
|-id=891 bgcolor=#fefefe
| 197891 ||  || — || September 8, 2004 || Uccle || T. Pauwels || NYS || align=right | 1.1 km || 
|-id=892 bgcolor=#fefefe
| 197892 ||  || — || September 8, 2004 || Drebach || J. Kandler || — || align=right | 1.5 km || 
|-id=893 bgcolor=#fefefe
| 197893 ||  || — || September 7, 2004 || Socorro || LINEAR || NYS || align=right | 1.1 km || 
|-id=894 bgcolor=#fefefe
| 197894 ||  || — || September 7, 2004 || Socorro || LINEAR || — || align=right | 1.0 km || 
|-id=895 bgcolor=#fefefe
| 197895 ||  || — || September 7, 2004 || Socorro || LINEAR || — || align=right data-sort-value="0.91" | 910 m || 
|-id=896 bgcolor=#fefefe
| 197896 ||  || — || September 7, 2004 || Socorro || LINEAR || V || align=right data-sort-value="0.95" | 950 m || 
|-id=897 bgcolor=#fefefe
| 197897 ||  || — || September 7, 2004 || Socorro || LINEAR || — || align=right | 1.5 km || 
|-id=898 bgcolor=#fefefe
| 197898 ||  || — || September 7, 2004 || Socorro || LINEAR || — || align=right | 1.5 km || 
|-id=899 bgcolor=#fefefe
| 197899 ||  || — || September 7, 2004 || Socorro || LINEAR || NYS || align=right data-sort-value="0.98" | 980 m || 
|-id=900 bgcolor=#fefefe
| 197900 ||  || — || September 7, 2004 || Socorro || LINEAR || — || align=right data-sort-value="0.99" | 990 m || 
|}

197901–198000 

|-bgcolor=#E9E9E9
| 197901 ||  || — || September 7, 2004 || Socorro || LINEAR || — || align=right | 1.5 km || 
|-id=902 bgcolor=#fefefe
| 197902 ||  || — || September 7, 2004 || Socorro || LINEAR || — || align=right | 1.4 km || 
|-id=903 bgcolor=#E9E9E9
| 197903 ||  || — || September 7, 2004 || Kitt Peak || Spacewatch || — || align=right data-sort-value="0.98" | 980 m || 
|-id=904 bgcolor=#d6d6d6
| 197904 ||  || — || September 7, 2004 || Kitt Peak || Spacewatch || — || align=right | 3.1 km || 
|-id=905 bgcolor=#E9E9E9
| 197905 ||  || — || September 7, 2004 || Kitt Peak || Spacewatch || — || align=right | 2.2 km || 
|-id=906 bgcolor=#E9E9E9
| 197906 ||  || — || September 7, 2004 || Kitt Peak || Spacewatch || — || align=right | 2.8 km || 
|-id=907 bgcolor=#E9E9E9
| 197907 ||  || — || September 7, 2004 || Kitt Peak || Spacewatch || — || align=right | 2.2 km || 
|-id=908 bgcolor=#fefefe
| 197908 ||  || — || September 8, 2004 || Socorro || LINEAR || NYS || align=right data-sort-value="0.88" | 880 m || 
|-id=909 bgcolor=#fefefe
| 197909 ||  || — || September 8, 2004 || Socorro || LINEAR || NYS || align=right data-sort-value="0.87" | 870 m || 
|-id=910 bgcolor=#fefefe
| 197910 ||  || — || September 8, 2004 || Socorro || LINEAR || V || align=right | 1.1 km || 
|-id=911 bgcolor=#fefefe
| 197911 ||  || — || September 8, 2004 || Socorro || LINEAR || MAS || align=right | 1.00 km || 
|-id=912 bgcolor=#E9E9E9
| 197912 ||  || — || September 8, 2004 || Socorro || LINEAR || — || align=right | 1.0 km || 
|-id=913 bgcolor=#fefefe
| 197913 ||  || — || September 8, 2004 || Socorro || LINEAR || NYS || align=right data-sort-value="0.83" | 830 m || 
|-id=914 bgcolor=#fefefe
| 197914 ||  || — || September 8, 2004 || Socorro || LINEAR || NYS || align=right data-sort-value="0.84" | 840 m || 
|-id=915 bgcolor=#fefefe
| 197915 ||  || — || September 8, 2004 || Socorro || LINEAR || — || align=right | 1.2 km || 
|-id=916 bgcolor=#fefefe
| 197916 ||  || — || September 8, 2004 || Socorro || LINEAR || LCI || align=right | 1.4 km || 
|-id=917 bgcolor=#fefefe
| 197917 ||  || — || September 8, 2004 || Socorro || LINEAR || — || align=right | 1.1 km || 
|-id=918 bgcolor=#fefefe
| 197918 ||  || — || September 8, 2004 || Socorro || LINEAR || — || align=right | 1.1 km || 
|-id=919 bgcolor=#fefefe
| 197919 ||  || — || September 8, 2004 || Socorro || LINEAR || — || align=right | 1.5 km || 
|-id=920 bgcolor=#E9E9E9
| 197920 ||  || — || September 8, 2004 || Socorro || LINEAR || — || align=right | 1.3 km || 
|-id=921 bgcolor=#fefefe
| 197921 ||  || — || September 8, 2004 || Socorro || LINEAR || KLI || align=right | 2.7 km || 
|-id=922 bgcolor=#fefefe
| 197922 ||  || — || September 8, 2004 || Socorro || LINEAR || NYS || align=right data-sort-value="0.92" | 920 m || 
|-id=923 bgcolor=#fefefe
| 197923 ||  || — || September 8, 2004 || Socorro || LINEAR || — || align=right | 1.1 km || 
|-id=924 bgcolor=#fefefe
| 197924 ||  || — || September 8, 2004 || Socorro || LINEAR || — || align=right | 1.3 km || 
|-id=925 bgcolor=#fefefe
| 197925 ||  || — || September 8, 2004 || Socorro || LINEAR || — || align=right | 1.3 km || 
|-id=926 bgcolor=#fefefe
| 197926 ||  || — || September 8, 2004 || Socorro || LINEAR || — || align=right | 3.1 km || 
|-id=927 bgcolor=#fefefe
| 197927 ||  || — || September 8, 2004 || Socorro || LINEAR || — || align=right | 1.3 km || 
|-id=928 bgcolor=#fefefe
| 197928 ||  || — || September 8, 2004 || Socorro || LINEAR || — || align=right | 1.2 km || 
|-id=929 bgcolor=#fefefe
| 197929 ||  || — || September 8, 2004 || Socorro || LINEAR || NYS || align=right data-sort-value="0.71" | 710 m || 
|-id=930 bgcolor=#fefefe
| 197930 ||  || — || September 8, 2004 || Socorro || LINEAR || — || align=right | 1.5 km || 
|-id=931 bgcolor=#E9E9E9
| 197931 ||  || — || September 8, 2004 || Socorro || LINEAR || — || align=right | 1.3 km || 
|-id=932 bgcolor=#fefefe
| 197932 ||  || — || September 8, 2004 || Socorro || LINEAR || — || align=right | 1.1 km || 
|-id=933 bgcolor=#fefefe
| 197933 ||  || — || September 8, 2004 || Socorro || LINEAR || — || align=right | 1.1 km || 
|-id=934 bgcolor=#fefefe
| 197934 ||  || — || September 8, 2004 || Socorro || LINEAR || MAS || align=right data-sort-value="0.99" | 990 m || 
|-id=935 bgcolor=#fefefe
| 197935 ||  || — || September 8, 2004 || Socorro || LINEAR || — || align=right | 1.2 km || 
|-id=936 bgcolor=#fefefe
| 197936 ||  || — || September 8, 2004 || Socorro || LINEAR || — || align=right | 1.4 km || 
|-id=937 bgcolor=#fefefe
| 197937 ||  || — || September 8, 2004 || Socorro || LINEAR || — || align=right | 1.2 km || 
|-id=938 bgcolor=#fefefe
| 197938 ||  || — || September 8, 2004 || Socorro || LINEAR || V || align=right | 1.1 km || 
|-id=939 bgcolor=#fefefe
| 197939 ||  || — || September 8, 2004 || Socorro || LINEAR || NYS || align=right data-sort-value="0.96" | 960 m || 
|-id=940 bgcolor=#fefefe
| 197940 ||  || — || September 8, 2004 || Socorro || LINEAR || NYS || align=right | 1.0 km || 
|-id=941 bgcolor=#fefefe
| 197941 ||  || — || September 8, 2004 || Socorro || LINEAR || — || align=right | 1.3 km || 
|-id=942 bgcolor=#fefefe
| 197942 ||  || — || September 8, 2004 || Socorro || LINEAR || CIM || align=right | 4.0 km || 
|-id=943 bgcolor=#E9E9E9
| 197943 ||  || — || September 8, 2004 || Socorro || LINEAR || HNS || align=right | 1.4 km || 
|-id=944 bgcolor=#fefefe
| 197944 ||  || — || September 8, 2004 || Socorro || LINEAR || — || align=right | 1.2 km || 
|-id=945 bgcolor=#fefefe
| 197945 ||  || — || September 8, 2004 || Socorro || LINEAR || — || align=right | 1.6 km || 
|-id=946 bgcolor=#fefefe
| 197946 ||  || — || September 8, 2004 || Socorro || LINEAR || NYS || align=right | 1.2 km || 
|-id=947 bgcolor=#E9E9E9
| 197947 ||  || — || September 8, 2004 || Socorro || LINEAR || — || align=right | 2.7 km || 
|-id=948 bgcolor=#fefefe
| 197948 ||  || — || September 8, 2004 || Palomar || NEAT || NYS || align=right | 1.1 km || 
|-id=949 bgcolor=#fefefe
| 197949 ||  || — || September 9, 2004 || Socorro || LINEAR || MAS || align=right | 1.0 km || 
|-id=950 bgcolor=#fefefe
| 197950 ||  || — || September 9, 2004 || Socorro || LINEAR || NYS || align=right | 1.0 km || 
|-id=951 bgcolor=#E9E9E9
| 197951 ||  || — || September 9, 2004 || Kitt Peak || Spacewatch || — || align=right | 1.1 km || 
|-id=952 bgcolor=#fefefe
| 197952 ||  || — || September 9, 2004 || Kleť || Kleť Obs. || — || align=right | 1.9 km || 
|-id=953 bgcolor=#E9E9E9
| 197953 ||  || — || September 9, 2004 || Hormersdorf || J. Lorenz || JUN || align=right | 1.6 km || 
|-id=954 bgcolor=#fefefe
| 197954 ||  || — || September 7, 2004 || Socorro || LINEAR || — || align=right data-sort-value="0.88" | 880 m || 
|-id=955 bgcolor=#E9E9E9
| 197955 ||  || — || September 7, 2004 || Palomar || NEAT || — || align=right | 1.4 km || 
|-id=956 bgcolor=#fefefe
| 197956 ||  || — || September 8, 2004 || Socorro || LINEAR || V || align=right | 1.1 km || 
|-id=957 bgcolor=#fefefe
| 197957 ||  || — || September 8, 2004 || Socorro || LINEAR || V || align=right data-sort-value="0.98" | 980 m || 
|-id=958 bgcolor=#fefefe
| 197958 ||  || — || September 8, 2004 || Socorro || LINEAR || — || align=right | 1.5 km || 
|-id=959 bgcolor=#fefefe
| 197959 ||  || — || September 8, 2004 || Palomar || NEAT || — || align=right | 1.3 km || 
|-id=960 bgcolor=#fefefe
| 197960 ||  || — || September 8, 2004 || Socorro || LINEAR || V || align=right | 1.1 km || 
|-id=961 bgcolor=#fefefe
| 197961 ||  || — || September 8, 2004 || Socorro || LINEAR || — || align=right | 1.0 km || 
|-id=962 bgcolor=#fefefe
| 197962 ||  || — || September 8, 2004 || Socorro || LINEAR || FLO || align=right | 1.0 km || 
|-id=963 bgcolor=#fefefe
| 197963 ||  || — || September 8, 2004 || Socorro || LINEAR || V || align=right | 1.2 km || 
|-id=964 bgcolor=#FA8072
| 197964 ||  || — || September 8, 2004 || Palomar || NEAT || — || align=right | 1.4 km || 
|-id=965 bgcolor=#fefefe
| 197965 ||  || — || September 8, 2004 || Palomar || NEAT || — || align=right | 1.6 km || 
|-id=966 bgcolor=#fefefe
| 197966 ||  || — || September 8, 2004 || Palomar || NEAT || — || align=right | 1.5 km || 
|-id=967 bgcolor=#fefefe
| 197967 ||  || — || September 8, 2004 || Campo Imperatore || CINEOS || FLO || align=right | 1.8 km || 
|-id=968 bgcolor=#fefefe
| 197968 ||  || — || September 9, 2004 || Kitt Peak || Spacewatch || V || align=right | 1.2 km || 
|-id=969 bgcolor=#fefefe
| 197969 ||  || — || September 9, 2004 || Kitt Peak || Spacewatch || — || align=right | 1.0 km || 
|-id=970 bgcolor=#FA8072
| 197970 ||  || — || September 11, 2004 || Socorro || LINEAR || — || align=right | 2.1 km || 
|-id=971 bgcolor=#fefefe
| 197971 ||  || — || September 11, 2004 || Goodricke-Pigott || R. A. Tucker || NYS || align=right data-sort-value="0.91" | 910 m || 
|-id=972 bgcolor=#E9E9E9
| 197972 ||  || — || September 6, 2004 || Socorro || LINEAR || — || align=right | 2.7 km || 
|-id=973 bgcolor=#fefefe
| 197973 ||  || — || September 7, 2004 || Kitt Peak || Spacewatch || — || align=right data-sort-value="0.93" | 930 m || 
|-id=974 bgcolor=#fefefe
| 197974 ||  || — || September 7, 2004 || Kitt Peak || Spacewatch || — || align=right | 1.1 km || 
|-id=975 bgcolor=#fefefe
| 197975 ||  || — || September 8, 2004 || Socorro || LINEAR || — || align=right | 1.5 km || 
|-id=976 bgcolor=#fefefe
| 197976 ||  || — || September 8, 2004 || Socorro || LINEAR || — || align=right | 3.5 km || 
|-id=977 bgcolor=#fefefe
| 197977 ||  || — || September 8, 2004 || Socorro || LINEAR || ERI || align=right | 2.8 km || 
|-id=978 bgcolor=#fefefe
| 197978 ||  || — || September 8, 2004 || Socorro || LINEAR || NYS || align=right | 1.1 km || 
|-id=979 bgcolor=#fefefe
| 197979 ||  || — || September 9, 2004 || Socorro || LINEAR || FLO || align=right data-sort-value="0.99" | 990 m || 
|-id=980 bgcolor=#fefefe
| 197980 ||  || — || September 9, 2004 || Socorro || LINEAR || — || align=right | 1.1 km || 
|-id=981 bgcolor=#fefefe
| 197981 ||  || — || September 9, 2004 || Socorro || LINEAR || — || align=right | 1.1 km || 
|-id=982 bgcolor=#fefefe
| 197982 ||  || — || September 9, 2004 || Socorro || LINEAR || ERI || align=right | 2.3 km || 
|-id=983 bgcolor=#fefefe
| 197983 ||  || — || September 9, 2004 || Socorro || LINEAR || MAS || align=right data-sort-value="0.97" | 970 m || 
|-id=984 bgcolor=#fefefe
| 197984 ||  || — || September 9, 2004 || Socorro || LINEAR || — || align=right | 1.5 km || 
|-id=985 bgcolor=#fefefe
| 197985 ||  || — || September 9, 2004 || Socorro || LINEAR || — || align=right | 1.4 km || 
|-id=986 bgcolor=#E9E9E9
| 197986 ||  || — || September 9, 2004 || Socorro || LINEAR || — || align=right | 4.5 km || 
|-id=987 bgcolor=#E9E9E9
| 197987 ||  || — || September 9, 2004 || Socorro || LINEAR || RAF || align=right | 1.6 km || 
|-id=988 bgcolor=#fefefe
| 197988 ||  || — || September 10, 2004 || Socorro || LINEAR || FLO || align=right | 1.00 km || 
|-id=989 bgcolor=#fefefe
| 197989 ||  || — || September 10, 2004 || Socorro || LINEAR || — || align=right | 1.1 km || 
|-id=990 bgcolor=#fefefe
| 197990 ||  || — || September 10, 2004 || Socorro || LINEAR || — || align=right | 1.1 km || 
|-id=991 bgcolor=#E9E9E9
| 197991 ||  || — || September 10, 2004 || Socorro || LINEAR || — || align=right | 2.3 km || 
|-id=992 bgcolor=#fefefe
| 197992 ||  || — || September 10, 2004 || Socorro || LINEAR || — || align=right | 1.2 km || 
|-id=993 bgcolor=#fefefe
| 197993 ||  || — || September 9, 2004 || Socorro || LINEAR || NYS || align=right data-sort-value="0.90" | 900 m || 
|-id=994 bgcolor=#FA8072
| 197994 ||  || — || September 11, 2004 || Socorro || LINEAR || PHO || align=right | 1.5 km || 
|-id=995 bgcolor=#fefefe
| 197995 ||  || — || September 7, 2004 || Socorro || LINEAR || — || align=right | 1.1 km || 
|-id=996 bgcolor=#E9E9E9
| 197996 ||  || — || September 8, 2004 || Palomar || NEAT || — || align=right | 2.0 km || 
|-id=997 bgcolor=#fefefe
| 197997 ||  || — || September 9, 2004 || Socorro || LINEAR || — || align=right | 1.1 km || 
|-id=998 bgcolor=#fefefe
| 197998 ||  || — || September 9, 2004 || Socorro || LINEAR || V || align=right data-sort-value="0.96" | 960 m || 
|-id=999 bgcolor=#fefefe
| 197999 ||  || — || September 10, 2004 || Socorro || LINEAR || V || align=right | 1.0 km || 
|-id=000 bgcolor=#fefefe
| 198000 ||  || — || September 10, 2004 || Socorro || LINEAR || V || align=right | 1.1 km || 
|}

References

External links 
 Discovery Circumstances: Numbered Minor Planets (195001)–(200000) (IAU Minor Planet Center)

0197